During the long history of the British science fiction television programme Doctor Who, a number of stories were proposed but, for a variety of reasons, never fully produced. Below is a list of unmade serials which were submitted by recognised professional writers and the BBC had intended to produce, but for one reason or another were not made. Many have since been the subject of a feature in Doctor Who Magazine, or other professional periodicals or books devoted to the television show.

Such serials exist during the tenure of each of the previous twelve incarnations of the Doctor. The reasons for the serials being incomplete include strike action (which caused the partially filmed Shada to be abandoned), actors leaving roles (The Final Game, which was cancelled after Roger Delgado's death), and the series being put on hiatus twice—once in 1985, and again in 1989—causing the serials planned for the following series to be shelved.

The plots of the unmade serials also vary. A theme of a civilisation where women are dominant was proposed twice—once for The Hidden Planet, and again for The Prison in Space. In some cases, elements of unmade serials were adapted, or were moved from one serial to another; for example, Song of the Space Whale was intended to be the introduction of Vislor Turlough until it was repeatedly set back, causing Mawdryn Undead to be Turlough's first appearance.

Some unused stories have since been adapted for other media. Shada was made into an audio play of the same name, while several unmade serials have been compiled into an audio series released by Big Finish called The Lost Stories.

First Doctor

Submitted for season 1

The Giants

The first serial of the series, The Giants, was originally to be written by C. E. Webber, the first episode being titled "Nothing at the End of the Lane", and would concern the four main characters (at that point named as the Doctor, Cliff, Lola, and Biddy) being shrunk to a "miniature size" and attacked by giant animals.

The serial established the Doctor's original backstory, revealing that the Time Lord had escaped from "his own galaxy" in the year 5733, seeking a perfect society in the past, and that he was pursued by agents from his own time who sought to prevent him from stopping their society from coming into being. By May 1963, a storyline for all four parts had been established and the first two episodes scripted. However, the story was rejected on 10 June 1963 on the grounds that the story was too thin on characterisation and that the giant monsters would be clichéd and too expensive to produce. Some of the initial opening script was retained for An Unearthly Child when Anthony Coburn was commissioned to write a replacement on 14 June 1963, though details like those about the Doctor's home were removed.

Around early September 1963, the idea was given to Robert Gould to develop, referred to as the "minuscule" storyline, which was anticipated to be the fourth serial of the season, but this story was later dropped from this slot in January 1964 and Gould abandoned work on the story altogether a month later. In March 1964, the story idea was offered to writer Louis Marks and eventually became Planet of Giants.

The Masters of Luxor
The Masters of Luxor, originally titled The Robots, was a six-part story submitted by Anthony Coburn while he was part of the BBC Script Department and considered for the second serial of Season 1, in which the Doctor faces a self-aware robot which is trying to gain a soul. It was rejected by the production team in mid-September 1963 in favour of Terry Nation's first Dalek serial. Titan Books published the unused scripts in August 1992. Edited by John McElroy, the text of Coburn's script was amended to fit in with accepted conventions – for example, consistent use of the name "Susan", rather than the "Suzanne" and "Sue" used by Coburn. It was later adapted by Nigel Robinson for Big Finish's The Lost Stories in August 2012.

The Hidden Planet
The Hidden Planet by Malcolm Hulke was commissioned in December 1963 and at one point was to be the fourth serial and then later the fifth serial of Series 1 after the insertion of The Edge of Destruction into the production block. It would further be deferred in January 1964 when it was realised that substantial rewrites would need to be undertaken. The story would have concerned a planet in an orbit opposite Earth's, with a parallel but in some ways opposite society to ours; for example, women were to be the dominant sex and all clovers would have four leaves. The original script was sent back for rewrites, and due to a pay dispute the rewrites were not made until after Susan had left the series; this necessitated further rewriting. A third submission was similarly rejected as Ian and Barbara were due to leave, and the script was dropped. The story was the subject of an April Fool's Day prank in 1983, when Doctor Who Magazine issue 76 claimed that one episode had in fact been filmed and rediscovered, and would be integrated into a twentieth anniversary special co-starring the Fifth Doctor entitled The Phoenix Rises.

Britain 408 AD
Written by Malcolm Hulke. The story involved the departure of the Romans from Britain around the start of the fifth century in the midst of clashes against the Celts and the Saxons, culminating with the time travellers fleeing the indigenous savages back to the safety of the TARDIS. Britain 408 AD was first submitted on 2 September 1963. Story editor David Whitaker asked Hulke to revise his original storyline as he felt that the plot—with its many opposing factions—was too complicated, and that the serial's conclusion echoed that of An Unearthly Child too closely. It was hoped that an amended version of Britain 408 AD might occupy the sixth slot of Season One (Serial F), to be directed by Christopher Barry, but on 23 September it was decided that the production block did not need another historical story and Hulke's serial was abandoned. The spot in the schedule was ultimately occupied by The Aztecs, while Hulke began work on The Hidden Planet instead (see above). Following Whitaker's departure, Hulke resubmitted Britain 408 AD. It was rejected on 2 April 1965, by Whitaker's successor, Dennis Spooner, because the Romans had already featured in his own story The Romans.

The Red Fort
Commissioned 24 September 1963, Terry Nation had intended for his second seven-part serial to be set during the British Raj in India (probably to have been the eighth serial), but the story was ultimately abandoned as the Daleks became a success, and demand for further science fiction adventures grew.

Farewell Great Macedon
Farewell Great Macedon (also known as Alexander the Great in the script's early stages) was a six-part story pitched for Season 1 and was written by Moris Farhi. In the story, the Doctor and his companions are framed for murder as part of a conspiracy to kill Alexander the Great and must pass a number of trials, including walking on hot coals, to gain the trust of his bodyguard Ptolemy. The script was published by Nothing at the End of the Lane in October 2009. It was later adapted by Nigel Robinson for Big Finish's The Lost Stories range in November 2010.

The Fragile Yellow Arc of Fragrance
The Fragile Yellow Arc of Fragrance was the first script sent by Moris Farhi. It was one episode long and was a calling card piece never seriously pitched for production. This story never made it to the production stage, and was included in the 2009 publication of Farhi's script for Farewell Great Macedon. It was later adapted by Nigel Robinson for Big Finish's The Lost Stories range in November 2010.

The Living World
Written by Alan Wakeman. Wakeman was one of several writers contacted by David Whitaker in mid-1963. The story was commissioned on 31 July 1963. It involved a planet ruled by sentient rocks and trees, with the ability to control humans with an inaudible sound. A four-part episodic storyline breakdown of the story featured in the third volume of the magazine Nothing at the End of the Lane. In this breakdown the following episode titles are quoted: "Airfish", "What Eats What", "The Living Planet" and "Just in Time". Note that in the script, Susan is referred to as Suzanne, and Barbara is referred to as Miss Canning.

"Untitled storyline (Gould)"
An idea suggested by Robert Gould when he abandoned work on the "miniscule" storyline in February 1964 that involved a planet where plants treated people the way people treat plants. This was rejected by Verity Lambert who felt it too close to the book The Day of the Triffids.

"Untitled storyline (Bennett)”
Written by Margot Bennett, the story was submitted in late February 1964, but was blocked out of production during filming of Planet of Giants, and the story idea was not pursued. The details of the plot for this storyline remain unknown.

Submitted for season 2

The Dark Planet
Written by Brian Hayles. This story was Hayles' first submission to the series. The story focused the Doctor, Ian, Barbara, and Vicki landing the TARDIS on the planet Numir, the sun of which is extinguished, and encounter the surface dwelling 'light people' and the subterranean 'shadow people'. The story was rejected in favour of Bill Strutton's The Web Planet by story editor Dennis Spooner on 8 February 1965, because the story was too similar to Malcolm Hulke's The Hidden Planet. It was later adapted by Matt Fitton for Big Finish's The Lost Stories range in September 2013.

The Slide
Written by Victor Pemberton. This story focused on a sentient form of mud that tries to take over the minds of British townfolk. Script editor for Doctor Who David Whittaker rejected it on the grounds that it was derivative of the Quatermass serials of the 1950s. Pemberton later submitted it to BBC Radio after he removed the Doctor Who elements from it. The Slide was commissioned as a seven-part serial which aired on the BBC Light Programme, beginning on 13 February 1966. This ultimately inspired Pemberton to adapt "The Slide" as the Doctor Who story, Fury from the Deep which aired in 1968.

Submitted for season 3

The Face of God
Written by, then producer, John Wiles not much is known about it.

The Hands of Aten
Written by Brian Hayles, not much is known about it. Submitted in November 1965, but was dropped January 1966.

The New Armada
Written by David Whitaker as he planned to leave his position as story editor. He submitted The New Armada in late February 1964 for season 2, but was rejected in the wake of The Dalek Invasion of Earth. He resubmitted for season 3 in late 1965, but was rejected by story editor Gerry Davis on January 17, 1966. The story was to be a six part story set in sixteenth-century Spain.

The Space Trap
Written by Robert Holmes and submitted to Story editor Donald Tosh on 25 April 1965. This four-part story idea involved the Doctor and his three companions arriving on an uninhabited planet to discover a spacecraft controlled by robots while its human occupants lie in suspended animation waiting for the additional crew members needed to once again operate their crashed ship. The Doctor and his companions are taken captive and trained up by the robots as the replacement crew members, however only three additional crew members are required, so the member of the Doctor's party that proves least useful is to be callously killed off by the human crew. This was Holmes first story submission for the series, and was primarily rejected due to the robots role being similar to that of the Mechanoids in The Chase from the previous season. Holmes would later resubmit this story idea to producer Peter Bryant on 20 May 1968 which led to the commissioning of what would become The Krotons.

The White Witch
Written by Brian Hayles, not much is known about it. Submitted in November 1965, but was dropped January 1966.

"Untitled storyline (Lucarotti)"
Written by John Lucarotti and was planned to be about the 1857 Indian Mutiny.

"Untitled storyline (Lucarotti 2)"
Written by John Lucarotti and was planned to be about Leif Eriksson. Story editor Donald Tosh turned down the storyline due to having already recently featured Vikings in The Time Meddler. Lucarotti later penned a short story for issue 184 of Doctor Who Magazine published in 1992, called "Who Discovered America?", which reuses the rejected storyline.

Submitted for season 4

The Clock
Written by David Ellis, not much is known about it.

This story was submitted in January 1966, but was rejected by story editor Gerry Davis on 4 April 1966, on the same day The Ocean Liner was rejected.

The Evil Eye
Written by Geoffrey Orme, not much is known about it. This story was rejected by Gerry Davis on 4 April 1966. Orme subsequently went to work on a second script which became The Underwater Menace.

The Hearsay Machine
Written by George F. Kerr, not much is known about it. This idea was submitted around the start of April 1966 and rejected by story editor Gerry Davis on 15 June 1966.

The Heavy Scent of Violence
Written by George Kerr, not much is known about it. This idea was submitted around the start of April 1966 and rejected by story editor Gerry Davis on 15 June 1966.

The Herdsmen of Aquarius
Written by Donald Cotton, and also known as The Herdsmen of Venus, not much is known about it. This story would involve the Loch Ness Monster and was under consideration in early August 1966.

The Hounds of Time
Written by Brian Hayles. This storyline was submitted around the time that Hayles had completed The Smugglers in mid-1966. It may have also needed to incorporate the Second Doctor. The story would have concerned a mad scientist who kidnaps humans from points of Earth's history. The scientist would have been revealed to be working for an alien warlord who wishes to study mankind in order to determine the optimal point in Earth's history to invade.

The Man from the Met
Written by George Kerr, not much is known about it. This idea was submitted around the start of April 1966 and rejected by story editor Gerry Davis on 15 June 1966.

The Nazis
Written by Brian Hayles. Hayles was commissioned to write a storyline for "The Nazis" on 8 March 1966. Shortly thereafter, however, he was engaged to write The Smugglers, which he was told should take a higher priority. "The Nazis" was ultimately abandoned on 15 June 1966, with the sentiment being that the events it portrayed were too close to the present day.

The Ocean Liner
Written by David Ellis, not much is known about it. This storyline was submitted by David Ellis as a spy thriller in January 1966, but ultimately rejected by Gerry Davis in April 1966.

"Untitled storyline (Laithwaite)"
Written by Eric Laithwaite, This story was submitted on the 28 June 1966, but was rejected by story editor Gerry Davis on 8 May 1967.

The People Who Couldn't Remember
Written by David Ellis & Malcolm Hulke, not much is known about it.

The story was submitted to the production office in April 1966, but script editor Gerry Davis rejected it on June 15, 1966, as Davis wanted to avoid airing comedy serials on television in the wake of the poorly received story, The Gunfighters.

Other First Doctor stories
 The Son of Doctor Who, a story idea originated by William Hartnell, allegedly involving the Doctor's "evil offspring" according to the factual Doctor Who book "The Vault"
 "Untitled American Civil War storyline", by unknown author
 "Untitled Egyptian storyline", by Dennis Spooner

Second Doctor

Submitted for season 4

The Ants
Written by Roger Dixon, this story was submitted on 16 January 1967. The basic story idea had the TARDIS bring the Doctor and his companions to the Nevada Desert, where they discover they have been shrunk to a tenth of an inch in height. To make matters worse, they learn that the local ants have been made super-intelligent by atomic bomb tests and plan to take over the Earth.

Bar Kochbar
Written by Roger Dixon, this story was submitted in early 1967. Simon bar Kokhba was the Jewish leader of what is known as the Bar Kokhba revolt against the Roman Empire in 132 AD.

The Big Store
Written by David Ellis & Malcolm Hulke, this story was submitted on 15 November 1966 and would involve faceless aliens infiltrating department stores as display mannequins. Ellis & Hulke would reuse the faceless aliens for their successful script submission The Faceless Ones.

The Imps
Written by William Emms. Planned as the fourth serial of Series 4, The Imps was a four-part story concerned about a spaceship overrun by Imp-like aliens and aggressive alien vegetation. The script was commissioned on 17 October 1966, and soon had to be rewritten to accommodate new companion Jamie. However, due to sickness on the part of Emms, this took so long that further rewrites were needed to explain the loss of Ben and Polly, its place in the schedule was taken by The Underwater Menace and on 4 January 1967 the story was dropped. Emms reused elements of the story in Mission to Venus, a Choose Your Own Adventure-style story featuring the Sixth Doctor.

The Mutant
Written by Barry Letts, this story outline, submitted around November 1966 to story editor Gerry Davis, would involve a race of beings undergoing a cycle of mutations, akin to that of a butterfly, moving from one form to another via a chrysalis stage. Letts would later, as producer, have writers Bob Baker & Dave Martin use this as the basis of their script The Mutants for Season 9.

The New Machines
Written by Roger Dixon, this story was submitted in early 1967. A race of people were wiped out by powerful robots that they created. The robots having become so advanced that they are then able to create a new race of people. The robots then fear that these new humans will dominate them, and when the Doctor arrives on their planet, they take this as proof of their fears.

The Return of the Neanderthal
Written by Roger Dixon, this storyline was about the TARDIS being dragged beneath the sands of Terunda to encounter people descended from Earth's Neanderthal Man who wish to return to the Earth of 2016. These story elements are similar to the story arc of the Silurians, intelligent reptiles that lived on Earth millions of years ago, dwell underground and wish to one day return to the surface.

The Sleepwalkers
Written by Roger Dixon, this six-part story was submitted on 16 January 1967. The story involved the TARDIS crew arriving on an Earth of the far future where a community of youth depend on the unseen Elders who dwell in the mountains.

Twin World
Written by Roger Dixon, not much is known about it. This story was submitted in early 1967.

"Untitled storyline (Dixon)"
Written by Roger Dixon, this story was submitted in early 1967 and is reported to have dealt with a world missing one fundamental aspect.

"Untitled storyline (Letts)"
Written by Barry Letts, this story, submitted around November 1966, was about a sinister organisation operating on Earth under cover of an amusement park. Letts later partly reused this idea as the radio adventure The Paradise of Death.

Submitted for season 5

The King's Bedtime Story
Written by Roger Dixon, this story was submitted on 16 January 1967. The Doctor and his companions are forced to perpetually enact the King's favourite story without changing any aspect of it.

Operation Werewolf
Written by Douglas Camfield & Robert Kitts, the storyline for this six-part story was submitted to the production office on 18 September 1967, although Camfield & fellow BBC worker Kitts had developed the outline in 1965 due to Camfield's dismay at another sub-standard script, and would probably have been directed by Camfield himself. The story saw the Doctor arrive in Normandy just prior to the D-Day landings. It would feature a plan to stop the Nazis from using a form of matter teleportation. Only a draft script for episode 1 would be written. It went through several rewrites until 1967 when it was finally abandoned due to producer Innes Lloyd moving on and the writers both having other commitments. This story was given individual episode titles even though this practice had stopped with The Savages in 1966. Episode titles were listed as: "The Secret Army", "Chateau of Death", "Lair of the Werewolf", "Friend Or Foe", "Village of the Swastika", and "Crossfire".

The Queen of Time
Four part adventure serial written by Brian Hayles. The story considered about the Doctor encountering the evil Hecuba, the relative of the Celestial Toymaker. It was later adapted by Catherine Harvey for Big Finish's The Lost Stories range in October 2013.

Submitted for season 6

The Aliens in the Blood
Written by Robert Holmes, this story was pitched on 22 October 1968. The story was set in the 22nd Century and dealt with an outbreak of mutants with ESP powers which disrupt the functions of a spacelane. The plot was reused by Holmes in 1977 as the non-Doctor Who radio serial Aliens in the Mind.

The Dreamspinner
Written by Paul Wheeler, not much is known about it. This four-part story was commissioned as a scene breakdown on 23 February 1968. It was dropped at a very late stage and replaced by The Space Pirates.

The Eye in Space
Written by Victor Pemberton. Concerning an omniscient octopoid eye in space which drew things toward it. Doctor Who producer Peter Bryant asked Pemberton to develop a new idea shortly after completing Fury from the Deep in late 1967. When Bryant left Doctor Who in early 1969, Pemberton decided not to pursue the story, and it was not formally commissioned.

The Harvesters
Written by William Emms, the serial was later redrafted in early 1970 as The Vampire Planet and was considered as the finale of season 7, but was soon dropped.<ref>SHannon, Patrick Sullivan, A brief history of Doctor Who stories- The Lost Stories (The Second Doctor)</ref>

The Impersonators
Written by Malcolm Hulke, not much is known about it, this six-part story was commissioned on 5 July 1968. The serial was cancelled on 30 December 1968 and its production budget allocated to The War Games, which Hulke co-wrote with Terrance Dicks, allowing that story to be expanded to 10 episodes.

The Laird of McCrimmon
Written by Mervyn Haisman & Henry Lincoln, this storyline was considered around mid-1968. The story would be set in Scotland in Jamie's ancestral home, Castle McCrimmon, where the Doctor's old foe the Great Intelligence plans to use Jamie's body. At the end of the story Jamie would remain behind as the new laird, ending his travels with the Doctor. By late April 1968, it was clear that Frazer Hines would be leaving the series sometime during Season Six. One candidate for his departure story was Haisman and Lincoln's third Yeti serial, which they were working on around the start of June. Over the summer, however, the writers became embroiled in a dispute over copyright with the BBC regarding the Quarks, robot monsters which had appeared in their previous Doctor Who commission, The Dominators. The ensuing acrimony resulted in the abandonment of The Laird of McCrimmon during August 1968.

The Lords of the Red Planet
Written by Brian Hayles. The story would have been about the origins of the Ice Warriors. The story was initiated after the transmission of their debut story. This storyline was dropped around May 1968. It was later adapted by John Dorney for Big Finish's The Lost Stories range in November 2013. The idea of the Ice Warriors returning to the series inspired Hayles to begin scripting The Seeds of Death.

The Prison in SpaceThe Prison in Space by Dick Sharples, originally titled The Amazons. The story also had a record of six other working titles during its development. Sharples returned to the idea of a female-dominated planet. last attempted with The Hidden Planet. The Doctor and Jamie were to be imprisoned, and Zoe was to start a sexual revolution and then be brainwashed. The four-part story was commissioned on 4 June 1968 and was intended to inject humour into the show. It was to feature Jamie in drag and end with Jamie deprogramming Zoe by smacking her bottom. The serial was rewritten to accommodate Frazer Hines' desire to leave by introducing a new companion named Nik, and again when he later decided to stay. Scripts for the first two episodes were delivered on 27 August 1968. The production team became unhappy with the serial, and when Sharples refused to perform further rewrites, the serial was dropped. The story was replaced by The Krotons. It was later adapted as Prison in Space by Simon Guerrier for Big Finish's The Lost Stories series in December 2010. In 2011, an illustrated scriptbook was released by Nothing at the End of the Lane.

The Rosemariners
Written by Donald Tosh. Beginning life as The Rosacrutians, this story came about after Tosh contacted the production staff in early 1968 to see if they would be interested in him pitching a script. Initial discussion saw the story begin as a story featuring Jamie and Victoria, but by the time Tosh delivered the first materials for the story Patrick Troughton had already decided to depart the series. At the point it was turned down by the production team Tosh had completed a script for the first episode and notes for the subsequent three episodes. Tosh completed a full storyline for Doctor Who Magazine (DWM) in 1994. Set on an Earth Space station it deals with a conflict between the staff of the station and the Rosemariners, a group who plan to hold the staff hostage in return for Earth supplying them with sophisticated weapons. It was later adapted by Tosh for Big Finish's The Lost Stories range in September 2012.

The Stones of Darkness
Written by Brian Hayles, not much is known about it.

"Untitled storyline (Ling)"
Written by Peter Ling, not much is known about it. This involved a story in which time runs backwards.

"Untitled storyline (Sherwin)"
Written by Derrick Sherwin, not much is known about it, apart from two things (according to The War Games' DVD information subtitles): it was going to be a studio-bound adventure and was to have ended with the exiled Doctor and Zoe stranded on Earth.

Third Doctor
Submitted for season 7
The Circles of Power
Written by Brian Hayles. This story would have focused on a faulty communications satellite which causes the release of robotic "sensorspheres" which induce amnesia on their victims. The incident would have almost ignited World War III.

The Mists of Madness
Written by Brian Wright. This story would have seen the Doctor discovering a community of artificially made humans. The storyline was submitted on 9 May 1969 and was commissioned by script editor Terrance Dicks. The story was scheduled to be the finale to Season 7 but due to Wright taking an academic writing post in Bristol, he was unable to write it so the story was abandoned.

The Shadow People
Written by Charlotte & Dennis Plimmer, this seven-part story was submitted to the production office 10 November 1969. It was seriously considered as the final story of Season 7 after The Mists of Madness was cancelled, but a pay dispute with the writers saw the story being dropped. The story was replaced by Inferno.

"Untitled storyline (Ray)"
Written by Trevor Ray, this story would have been set underwater.

Submitted for season 8
The Cerebroids
Written by Brian Wright, this story was commissioned on 24 June 1970 before being abruptly dropped on 29 June 1970.

The Space War
Written by Ian Stuart Black and also known as The Furies, this six-part story was commissioned on 9 November 1969.

The Hollow Men
Written by Brian Hayles. A Seventh Doctor Past Doctor Adventure novel was released with the same title in April 1998, but has an unrelated plot.

The Spare-Part People
Written by Jon Pertwee & Reed De Rouen and also known as The Brain Drain and The Labyrinth, this seven-part story was submitted to the production team in the summer of 1970. In the proposed storyline the Doctor poses as a Cambridge don to investigate a series of disappearances. He himself is kidnapped and taken to a civilization under Antarctica.

"Untitled storyline (Camfield)"
Written by Douglas Camfield, this story involved a hidden Amazon city and was submitted in late 1970.

"Untitled storyline (Worth)"
Written by Martin Worth, this story would involve plant life trying to take over the Earth. The season 8 opener, Terror of the Autons, featured the Master using plastic flowers to take over the Earth.

Submitted for season 9
The Brain-Dead
Written by Brian Hayles, this was submitted to the production office during the spring of 1971. The story involved an Ice Warrior plan to invade the Earth using a 'Z' beam which freezes things it strikes to absolute zero. When used on humans, it turns them into zombie-like slaves. Script editor Dicks rejected the storyline, but the inclusion of the Ice Warriors inspired the development of The Curse of Peladon.

The Daleks in LondonThe Daleks in London, commissioned on 25 May 1971, was to be the final story of Season 9 in 1972, re-introducing the Daleks after a five-year absence. Little is known about the exact storyline of the six-part Robert Sloman serial, other than the fact that it would have had some similarities to The Dalek Invasion of Earth, except set in contemporary London. This similarity caused the production team some concern, and producer Barry Letts eventually decided that he would rather start the season with a Dalek adventure instead of ending it with one. An unrelated submission by Louis Marks was therefore rewritten into Day of the Daleks, and The Time Monster was then written and commissioned to replace the original series finale.

The Mega
Written by Bill Strutton, this four-part story was submitted to the production office on 25 September 1970 after Strutton had gained an interest in writing for the series again after scripting The Web Planet five years earlier. Despite Strutton working heavily on the project, it was ultimately discarded. It was later adapted by Simon Guerrier as a six-part story for Big Finish's The Lost Stories range in December 2013.

The Shape of Terror
Written by Brian Hayles, this story was submitted during the spring of 1971. This story would have seen an alien shape-shifting entity attacking a space station and attempts to merge itself with the Doctor, which unwittingly causes its own destruction. Hayles recycled elements from it, particularly its Agatha Christie mystery style in his script for The Curse of Peladon.

Submitted for season 10
Multiface
Written by Godfrey Harrison, this four-part story was commissioned by Letts on 19 July 1971. Feeling it was more fantastical than appropriate for Doctor Who, Letts dropped the story on 25 February 1972.

Submitted for season 11
The Automata
Written by Robert Holmes, this four-part story was commissioned on 16 January 1973. Letts and Dicks did not like the storyline and it was replaced by The Time Warrior.

The Final Game
The Third Doctor's final story was to be The Final Game by Robert Sloman and Barry Letts as an uncredited co-writer which was commissioned on 15 February 1973. The story was to end with the reveal that the Master and the Doctor were brothers or two different, opposing aspects of the same being (the Ego and the Id), and the Master dying in a manner which suggested that he sacrificed himself to save the Doctor's life. The actor who played the Master, Roger Delgado, was killed in a car accident in Turkey on 18 June 1973, forcing the scrapping of the story. The story was immediately replaced by Planet of the Spiders. A fan-made audio drama series has been created to preserve the story's legacy and give it new life.

Fourth Doctor
Submitted for season 12
Space Station
Written by Christopher Langley, this storyline for a four-part story was submitted to the production office on 30 December 1973. The story involved the Doctor and Sarah arrived at a space station in the far-future, a period when mankind no longer lives on Earth. It was subsequently commissioned for scripts on 24 January 1974 and planned as the second story of Season 12. It was dropped on 17 June 1974 and replaced by Lucarotti's The Ark in Space.

The Ark in Space (Lucarotti)
Written by John Lucarotti, this script came about after Space Station was rejected and Lucarotti was suggested by Terrance Dicks as a replacement writer on the strength of his Moonbase 3 script. The story would use the same space station setting as Space Station, the setting being dictated by the production office as means of saving money by having it share sets with Revenge of the Cybermen. Commissioned in June 1974, Lucarotti devised the concept of the ark, a space station that housed a huge plot of countryside the size of Kent – a sort of Home Counties in space. His six-part story concerned the invasion of the ark by a species called the Delc, a spore-like fungus with separate heads and bodies. The final episode was to have the Doctor defeating the Delc leader by hitting it out into space with a golf club, and indeed Lucarotti planned to give each episode a frivolous title, citing Puffball as the title of an early episode and Golfball as the title of the final episode. When the draft scripts arrived from his home in Corsica, Holmes and Hinchcliffe felt they were far too ambitious and complicated to realise on the programme's budget and Lucarotti had over-conceptualised the story, which meant that it was inappropriate for the viewers. It was replaced by a different story with the same title by Robert Holmes, which shared only the setting with the previous version. Big Finish Productions has announced an audio adaptation of this story, written by Jonathan Morris for their Lost Stories range for release in March 2023. This adaptation will maintain the original episode titles, as written by Lucarotti.

The Sea of Fear
Written by Brian Hayles submitted this storyline to the production office on 9 March 1974. The story involves the Doctor and Sarah becoming caught up in an experiment to determine the true ancestors of humankind.

"Untitled storyline (Adams)"
Written by Douglas Adams, this story was submitted around the middle of 1974. It involved a space ship leaving Earth and filled with the affluent but "useless" members of society. The story was rejected due to being too similar to The Ark in Space, which was also being developed around that time. Adams later adapted the material for the "B Ark" storyline of The Hitchhiker's Guide to the Galaxy.

"Untitled storyline (Sloman)"
Written by Robert Sloman. This storyline was submitted in November 1974. Not much is known about it.

"Untitled Dalek storyline"
Written by Terry Nation. It was rejected for being too similar to his previous Dalek stories. It was replaced with Genesis of the Daleks. Big Finish Productions has announced an audio adaptation of the script from the first episode of this story with additional material for the rest of the story adapted into an audiobook by Simon Guerrier for release in March 2023.

 Return of the Cybermen 
Written by Gerry Davis. This story was submitted to the production office, sometime in 1974 and commissioned soon after. The story was reworked by script editor Robert Holmes into Revenge of the Cybermen after the production crew had reservations about it, though Davis still received the full credit. It was later adapted by John Dorney for Big Finish's The Lost Stories in March 2021.

Submitted for season 13
The Angarath
Written by Eric Pringle. Pringle was commissioned on 11 August 1975 by producer Philip Hinchcliffe to write the first two episodes of the four-part story. Pringle submitted the final two episodes without commission on 10 March 1976, but the story was cancelled on 23 June 1976.

The Beasts of Manzic
Written by Robin Smyth, this six-part story was rejected on 13 May 1975.

The Eyes of Nemesis
Written by Brian Hayles, this story was submitted to the production office on 15 May 1975. It would involve the Doctor and Sarah in a chase between the hunter Torr and his quarry Lakdem. Towards the end of the adventure it is revealed that Torr works for the Celestial Toymaker.

Fires of the Starmind
Written by Marc Platt, this unsolicited story was submitted to script editor Robert Holmes in late 1975 and dealt with a sentient star using the Time Lord libraries as a means of invading Gallifrey. Holmes felt that it lacked action and drama, and was in need of a proper antagonist. Even so, Robert Holmes thought that Fires of the Starmind had more potential than most of the other amateur submissions and he encouraged Marc Platt to continue writing. Fires of the Starmind was rejected on 15 December 1975.

The Haunting
Written by Terrance Dicks, this six-part story was submitted at the start of November 1974 and was to have dealt with vampires. The storyline was commissioned on 11 December 1974, but was abandoned on 13 May 1975. Dicks later reused some of the material for his 1977 script The Vampire Mutations, the story that eventually evolved further and became State of Decay in 1980.

The Menday Fault
Written by David Wiltshire, this was an unsolicited script for a six-part story. The story revolved around a nuclear submarine diving into the 'Fault of Menday' and discovering a subterranean world. The 'sun' for this world is dying and the underground dwellers, Suranians led by Zorr, are planning to invade the surface world. Wiltshire was never commissioned to develop the storyline further.

The Nightmare Planet
Written by Dennis Spooner, this story was to be concerned with a planet where drugs in the food and water are used to control the populace. Punishment would be meted out by temporary withdrawal from the drugs which would cause people to see monsters all around them. The storyline for the four-part story was commissioned on 31 January 1975 and the full scripts on 4 February 1975.

The Prisoner of Time
Written by Barry Letts, the storyline for this four-part story was commissioned on 21 January 1975. It was based on an audition piece for the role of Sarah Jane Smith that Letts had written in 1973 and was initially known as Time Lord Story. Scripts were requested, but Hinchcliffe was unhappy with the draft of the first part and ultimately the story was dropped.

Pyramids of Mars (Greifer)
Written by Lewis Greifer, this story was commissioned in July 1974. The story would involve museum keepers being chased out of the British Museum by a mummy. It would turn out that a group was scaring people away in order to gain access to a sarcophagus which would contain wild rice from thousands of years ago. The group wanted to use the rice to seed Mars and make a fortune. It was replaced by Robert Holmes' Pyramids of Mars but under the pen name, Stephen Harris, when Griefer fell ill and the scripts came in late and were not what the production team wanted.

Return to Sukannan
Written by Terry Nation, this story was commissioned for a storyline on 13 February 1975. It was replaced by The Android Invasion.

The Silent Scream
Written by Chris Boucher, this story was an unsolicited submission sent to the production office in early 1975. Although only fifteen minutes worth of material was considered unsuitable for Doctor Who, script editor Robert Holmes brought in Chris Boucher to discuss ideas with himself and producer Philip Hinchcliffe. This led to unmade scripts for The Dreamers of Phados and The Mentor Conspiracy, before finally being commissioned as The Face of Evil.

Submitted for season 14
The Gaslight Murders
Written by Basil Dawson, this four-part story involving murders in Victorian London. Dawson, a veteran screenwriter, was approached by script editor Robert Holmes to develop a story which would introduce a new companion to replace Sarah Jane Smith following her departure. The new character was to be a Cockney girl whom the Doctor would take under his wing and educate, in the manner of Eliza Doolittle in the George Bernard Shaw play Pygmalion. This story was planned to be the fourth story of Season 14. The Gaslight Murders was quickly abandoned, however. Its spot in the schedule was ultimately filled by The Face of Evil with the Eliza Doolittle character being replaced with Leela, while Holmes reused the general framework in The Talons of Weng-Chiang.

The Foe from the Future
Written by Robert Banks Stewart as a six-part story, the story was commissioned in May 1976. This story was replaced by The Talons of Weng-Chiang, which used the same basic premise of a villain traveling back in time, when Stewart took up the post of script editor on the series Armchair Thriller and was unable to deliver the scripts, forcing Robert Holmes to step in to rework the story. It was later adapted by John Dorney for Big Finish's The Lost Stories range in January 2012.

The Dreamers of Phados
Written by Chris Boucher, was submitted at some point after The Silent Scream had been rejected in early 1975. It was based on a premise that Hinchcliffe and Holmes wanted to use in which people and machines are controlled by a computer that malfunctions. It was to be set on a space ship which has been home to several generations of a civilization. Boucher recycled some elements in The Face of Evil.

The Lost Legion
Written by Douglas Camfield, this four-part story was commissioned on 22 January 1976. The story would involve the Doctor and Sarah arriving in North Africa at an isolated French Legion outpost. This has become the battleground for a fight between two alien races, the Skarkel and Khoorians. The story was planned to write out the character of Sarah and would see Sarah killed by one of the aliens. The first script was submitted on 9 February 1976 and removed from the series schedule in April 1976. Camfield would continue to work on the scripts, delivering the final part on 24 September 1976, but the production team were no longer interested in pursuing the story.

The Mentor Conspiracy
Written by Chris Boucher, this story was, like The Dreamer of Phados, written to an idea brief from Holmes and Hinchcliffe. It was to be set on a space ship which has been home to several generations of a civilization. The script was turned down on 30 October 1975.

Submitted for season 15
The Vampire Mutations
Written by Terrance Dicks and script edited by Robert Holmes, this four-part story was scheduled to be the opening serial of Season 15, featuring the Fourth Doctor and Leela investigating three sinister vampires who malevolently controlled a medieval Earth village and had far grander intentions than first appeared. The serial was ready to be made until the BBC decided that they didn't want Doctor Who to be doing a story about vampires at the same time that they were doing a dramatisation of Bram Stoker's Count Dracula starring Louis Jourdan in the title role. The Vampire Mutations was therefore replaced by Horror of Fang Rock, also written by Terrance Dicks, after Robert Holmes told Dicks to write him a new story set on a lighthouse. The Vampire Mutations is a rarity among unmade Doctor Who serials in that its script was later changed, adapted and made into an actual televised serial for Season 18. Season 18's script editor, Christopher H. Bidmead, was looking through old scripts that had never been made for one reason or another and came across The Vampire Mutations, liked the script more than the others and then contacted Dicks. Bidmead and Dicks then worked alongside each other to develop what became the Season 18 serial State of Decay, with their ideas for the script often clashing.

Killers of the Dark
Following the successful realisation of the Doctor's home planet of Gallifrey on screen in The Deadly Assassin, producer Graham Williams wanted another Gallifrey story. Script editor Anthony Read approached David Weir with whom he had worked before. Weir's script, a six-part story, was planned as the final story of Season 15 and was commissioned on 18 July 1977. Weir's script had elements drawn from Asian cultures, and included a race of cat-people with links to Gallifrey. Scenes included a gladiatorial duel in a stadium filled with cat-people. Read and director Gerald Blake, upon reading the finished script, determined that the story would be impossible to shoot on Doctor Whos budget and the story was abandoned mid-August 1977. With only two weeks to spare before filming, Read and Williams quickly co-wrote a replacement script in the form of The Invasion of Time. When asked about Weir's story at a fan convention years later, Williams could not recall its title and made up the name The Killer Cats of Geng Singh, by which title the story became widely known in fan circles.

The Divided
Written by Moris Farhi, this four-part story was officially commissioned by producer Graham Williams on 8 November 1977. The script was not produced and Farhi no longer recalls what it was about; the script itself is lost. It is unclear of whether this was considered for either season 15 or season 16.

The Krikkitmen
Written by Douglas Adams, this was one of several ideas that Adams proposed to the production office around 1976. Adams had submitted The Hitchhiker's Guide to the Galaxy scripts to both BBC Radio and the Doctor Who department. Adams was hired by Doctor Who first but was then subsequently hired by BBC Radio as well. The Krikkitmen is believed to be the story he had spent the most time working on, before it was rejected by script editor Robert Holmes, who encouraged Adams to work on The Hitchhiker's Guide instead and continue submitting material for Doctor Who, although for Season 16; this ultimately led to his commission for The Pirate Planet. In 1980, Adams revised The Krikkitmen for use by Paramount Pictures as a potential Doctor Who feature film, although nothing came of this project. Finally, Adams included many of the ideas from The Krikkitmen in his novel Life, the Universe and Everything, the second sequel to his book The Hitchhiker's Guide to the Galaxy. A novel adaptation of the Doctor Who version by James Goss was released by BBC Books in January 2018.

"Untitled storyline (Holmes)"
Written by Robert Holmes, this storyline was considered in the autumn of 1976 when it was assumed Hinchcliffe would still be producing Season 15. It was to have been inspired by Joseph Conrad's novel Heart of Darkness.

Submitted for season 16
The 1995 Doctor Who Magazine Summer Special ran a feature on a supposed lost Season 16-story titled The Lords of Misrule that purported to be by Ted Willis. This was a hoax based on a misreport that Willis - the creator of Dixon of Dock Green - had been commissioned to write for Doctor Who in this season, not Lewis.

Shield of Zareg
Written by Ted Lewis, and also known as The Doppelgängers, The search for the fourth segment of the Key to Time takes the Doctor and Romana to Nottingham where they meet Robin Hood and discover that the alleged hero is actually a blackhearted villain. The scripts for the first two episodes of the four-part fourth serial of the season were delivered to the production office on 28 April 1978. Although a third script arrived on 12 May 1978, Lewis turning up inebriated to a meeting with Graham Williams and Anthony Read and the unsuitability of the submitted material meant the story was dropped and replaced by David Fisher's The Androids of Tara, which deliberately adopted the same swashbuckling genre as Lewis' storyline..

"Untitled storyline (Boucher)"
Written by Chris Boucher, this idea was submitted shortly after Boucher had completed Image of the Fendahl. The story involved a remote Earth outpost under attack. BBC Head of Drama Ronnie Marsh did not want writers working on both Doctor Who and Blake's 7 at the same time, and the story was consequently dropped.

"Untitled storyline (Adams)"
Proposed by Douglas Adams. It concerned the time lords mining a planet and using a machine that would sap the aggression out of the natives to make them peaceful. One time lord would become trapped in the statue and absorb all the aggression driving him insane. He planned to make the machine dematerialise, reform around Gallifrey and hollow Gallifrey out. Elements from this story were re-used by Adams in his script of The Pirate Planet.

"Untitled storyline (Baker and Martin)"
Proposed by Bob Baker and Dave Martin. It concerned two planets (Atrios and Zeos) at war over a catastrophic shift in their orbits. The war was being baited on a mysterious force. The Doctor was forced to make a temporary Key to Time to temporarily freeze both planets' armies. The Shadow (the mysterious force who was provoking the war) was planning to use the powers of the Key to time to pit the universe at war against everyone. His own shadow was the sixth segment. The Doctor thwarted the Shadow's plan by unfreezing both planet armies and giving each the co-ordinates of the Shadow's planet which just so happened to be in between both planets. Many elements of this story were recycled to create The Armageddon Factor.

Submitted for season 17
The Gamble With Time
Written by David Fisher, The Gamble With Time was initially set in 1920s Las Vegas, which was later changed by Fisher to Paris and Monte Carlo in 1928, along with a 16th-century Florence timeline as well, and had The Doctor and Romana teaming up with a detective named Pug. Gambling was going to be a big focal point to the story, as well as an ancient alien race called the Sephiroth. The Gamble With Time evolved further into the Season 17 serial City of Death which was written by Douglas Adams and Graham Williams over a weekend at Williams' house, under the pen name of David Agnew.

Shada

Shada was a six-part serial written by Douglas Adams that was scheduled to conclude Season 17 and be broadcast from 19 January - 23 February 1980. Production was halted during studio recordings due to a strike, with the remaining studio scenes never being recorded, and the serial never transmitted. A reconstruction of the serial using the Fourth Doctor's narration and existing footage was later released on VHS in 1992. The story was later adapted by Big Finish in 2003 as a webcast production featuring Paul McGann's Eighth Doctor (and later released as an audio story that same year), while Adams himself reused elements from the serial for his first Dirk Gently novel Dirk Gently's Holistic Detective Agency. The story was novelised by Gareth Roberts in 2012, and completed with animation in 2017, with most of the original cast returning to play their original roles.

Child Prodigy
Written by Alistair Beaton & Sarah Dunant, this four-part story was commissioned on 12 December 1978. The scripts were delivered on 5 January 1979 and rejected four days later as unacceptable.

The Doomsday Contract
For Season 17, John Lloyd, a frequent collaborator with script editor Douglas Adams, adapted material from his unpublished science fiction story GiGax and in October 1978 submitted Shylock, a four-part serial written in Adams' light-hearted style. After providing a second draft of the storyline to modify parts of the script to avoid issues such as the rules involving child actors, Lloyd was forced to focus on his commitments as producer of Not the Nine O'Clock News. Williams was still interested enough in the storyline that he made plans to involved writer Allan Prior to work on the scripts. The storyline was commissioned on 7 February 1979 and a script list dated 29 June 1979 links Lloyd and Prior to the project. Lloyd officially agreed to another writer taking on his story on 25 August 1979. In the story, the Doctor is subpoenaed to appear in court when a corporation tries to buy Earth in order to obtain a matter-transmutation device. It was later adapted by Nev Fountain for Big Finish's The Lost Stories in March 2021.

Erinella
Written by Pennant Roberts, this four-part story was commissioned on 10 January 1979 as Dragons of Fear. The adventure would involve the planet Erinella and two men fighting over a princess. The Doctor would become involved in his own timeline by arriving at the wrong time and becoming accused of being a poisoner. Roberts resubmitted the story in the mid-1980s to script editor Eric Saward, but nothing came of the submission.

The Secret of Cassius
Written by Andrew Smith, this story was rejected by Read in August 1978.

The Tearing of the Veil
Written by Allen Drury, the scripts were commissioned on 2 April 1979 for this four-part story. The story was set in the Victorian era and the entire action would take place in and around a vicarage. The vicar has recently died and fake spiritualists are exploiting the widow. The first episode would open with a seance during which the TARDIS would arrive. On 19 September 1979, the story was accepted subject to alterations.

Valley of the Lost
Written by Philip Hinchcliffe, this story involved the Doctor and Romana encountering an alien Luron called Godrin who crash landed in a South American jungle in 1870. Adams wrote to Hinchcliffe on 3 January 1979, explaining that the proposed script would be too costly to produce. It was later adapted as The Valley of Death by Jonathan Morris for Big Finish's The Lost Stories series in January 2012.

"Untitled storyline (Adams)"
Written by Douglas Adams, this story would involve the Doctor going into retirement but being constantly called upon to solve various problems. It was considered as the final story of Series 17 until Williams dismissed the idea. It was replaced by Shada.

"Untitled storyline (Mills & Wagner)"
Written by Pat Mills & John Wagner, this story was submitted around the start of 1979. The story would involve a parallel universe in which the Roman Empire never fell. Mills & Wagner subsequently adapted it to become the comic story The Iron Legion for Doctor Who Weekly in late 1979.

Submitted for season 18
The Castle of Doom
Written by David Fisher, this story was submitted by Fisher on 7 November 1979. John Nathan-Turner rejected it in favour of developing The Leisure Hive.

The Dogs of Darkness
Written by Jack Gardner, a scene breakdown for this four-part story was commissioned on 29 March 1980 and the scripts on 11 August 1980. It was still under consideration in April 1981, when Jack Gardner was asked to expand "The Dogs of Darkness" into full scripts for the Fifth Doctor for Season 19.

Farer Nohan
Written by Andrew Stephenson, a scene breakdown for this four-part story was commissioned on 18 March 1980.

Into the Comet
Written by James Follett, this involved monsters attacking a race of beings who live inside Halley's Comet, unaware that there is anything beyond it they believe that their world is the sum and total of the universe. Into the Comet would have used the companions of Romana and K9. Follett was a novelist who pitched this idea to script editor Douglas Adams circa September 1979 when they met up and discussed the forthcoming return of Halley's Comet. Though the storyline was rejected by Adams, Follett resubmitted Into the Comet to new script editor Christopher H. Bidmead around May 1980, but once again the storyline was not pursued.

Invasion of the Veridians
Written by Nabil Shaban (better known as Sil from the Colin Baker Doctor Who stories Vengeance on Varos and The Trial of a Time Lord) who was a longtime fan of Doctor Who and had previously suggested himself to replace the late Roger Delgado as the Master. In offering this script to the production office in 1980, Shaban also put himself forward as a potential successor to Tom Baker as the Doctor. Nothing came of Invasion of the Veridians. Nabil Shaban had only written the first episode, it was written around the early 1970s, and was very much influenced by the Troughton/Pertwee era. Nabil believes that the only copy has now been lost to time, as he no longer has it.

Mark of Lumos
Written by Keith Miles, a story outline for this four-part story was commissioned on 14 March 1980.

Mouth of Grath
Written by Malcolm Edwards & Leroy Kettle, a scene breakdown for this four-part story was commissioned on 18 March 1980.

The Psychonauts
Written by David Fisher, this story was discussed with Script Editor Douglas Adams in late 1979, shortly before Adams left Doctor Who. New producer Nathan-Turner was not interested and instead The Leisure Hive was developed as the season opener.

Romanoids
Written by Geoff Lowe, this spec outline arrived at the production office in the summer of 1980. It was passed on to Nathan-Turner on 9 December 1980.

Sealed Orders
Written by Christopher Priest, a scene breakdown for this four-part story was commissioned on 27 February 1980 and the full scripts on 24 March 1981. The story, set on Gallifrey, involved hopping back and forth in time resulting in multiple variants of the TARDIS and a spare Doctor, one of whom was killed. The story was abandoned and replaced with Stephen Gallagher's Warriors' Gate.

Soldar and the Plastoids
Written by John Bennett, a scene breakdown for this four-part story was commissioned on 10 April 1980.

Song of the Space Whale
Space-Whale was originally pitched by Pat Mills and his writing partner John Wagner in 1980 as a Fourth Doctor adventure. When the production office showed some signs of interest, Wagner left the project and the script was commissioned as a four-part Fifth Doctor story for a scene breakdown on 7 September 1981 and full scripts on 2 December 1981. The new drafts reduced the humor and the renamed Song of the Space Whale was now planned as the third serial in Season 20 and intended to introduce new companion Vislor Turlough. The story concerned a group of people living in the belly of a giant whale in space. The Doctor would find this out while attempting to protect the creature from being slaughtered by a rusting factory ship. The castaways living in the whale, as well as the ship's captain, would be working class characters, with the former's dialogue being based on that of a working-class Northern Irish family that Mills knew. During the writing, Mills and script editor Eric Saward "fundamentally disagreed" on the character of the captain (Saward wanting a more Star Trek-type figure) and the dialogue for the castaways. Mills has said that "there was a Coronation Street quality to it that Eric felt didn't work in space. He thought the future would be classless, and I didn't." Mills' disagreements with Saward led to the script being delayed until it was too late to serve as Turlough's introductory story. The script was then considered for Season 21 and later still Season 22. By this point the script had been revised as two 45-minute episodes, but although it was still listed in July 1985 as an ongoing script, by November 1985 Nathan-Turner confirmed at a convention that the script had been dropped. The "Space Whale" concept was eventually revised and realised in the 2010 episode The Beast Below. The rejected script was later adapted as The Song of Megaptera by Mills for Big Finish's The Lost Stories in May 2010.

"Untitled storyline (Brosnan)"
Written by John Brosnan who submitted this idea sometime after Bidmead became script editor in January 1980. The story would have involved the Doctor arriving at the BBC Television Centre and meeting Tom Baker. The two would then pair up to combat a threat.

Fifth Doctor
Submitted for season 19
The Enemy Within
Written by Christopher Priest, the opportunity to write this four-part story was offered to Priest after his previous script, Sealed Orders, had been cancelled. The scene breakdown was commissioned on 5 December 1980 and the scripts on 6 February 1981. Priest's story idea dealt with the 'secret' of what actually powered the TARDIS, in this case fear. Somewhere hidden inside the TARDIS was the one being the Doctor feared above all others, and the psychic tension between the two of them produced the energy to move through space and time. The story involved the Doctor having to confront and ultimately defeat this fear, and was designed to write out the character of Adric. After hearing nothing from the production office with regard to his completed scripts or his payment for them, Priest made contact with John Nathan-Turner. He was told that the scripts were unusable and that he would not be paid. After a bitter dispute Priest was paid and both Nathan-Turner and Eric Saward forced to pen a letter of apology over their treatment of the writer. The script was replaced by Saward's script Earthshock.

Genesis of the Cybermen
Written by Gerry Davis, this four-part story was submitted on spec to the production office around February 1982. It concerned the Doctor arriving on Mondas at a point in time when the Cybermen are being created. The rough storyline was where the Doctor and his companion "Felicity" arrive on the planet Mondas, Earth's twin orbiting on the opposite side of the Sun. While the Doctor works on a piece of TARDIS equipment, Felicity encounters the gentle Prince Sylvan. Sylvan accidentally activates the TARDIS, sending him, the Doctor and Felicity fifty years into the future. There, Sylvan's brother, Dega, is now king and has used the Doctor's device to begin turning his people into Cybermen. He has constructed a space fleet with which he intends to invade the mineral-rich Earth, and plans to kill any unconverted Mondasians with cyanide gas. Felicity appeals to Dega's partly Cybernised wife, Queen Meta, and she shoots her husband dead—only to be killed by Dega's chief of staff, Krail. In the confusion, Sylvan and a band of Mondan rebels flee in the spaceships to Earth; the massive concussion of take-off knocks Mondas out of its orbit into deep space. Former script editor Davis submitted this idea circa early 1981, intending it to be a prequel to his and Kit Pedler's original Cyberman serial, The Tenth Planet (which also featured Cyberman Krail). It also borrowed elements from The Ark and The Savages, two stories which Davis had been story editor on. Producer John Nathan-Turner and script editor Antony Root were ultimately not interested in Genesis of the Cybermen. Davis wrote his storyline with only the Doctor and one female companion in mind; he called this character "Felicity" rather than writing with any particular companion in mind. Elements of this story were later used in Big Finish Production's Spare Parts by Marc Platt in July 2002 with the Felicity role filled in by Nyssa.

Hebos
Written by Rod Beacham, a scene breakdown for this four-part story was commissioned on 5 December 1980.

Project Zeta Sigma
The Fifth Doctor's first story was originally intended to be the four-part Project Zeta Sigma, written by John Flanagan & Andrew McCulloch, who had previously scripted Meglos. It was not intended to follow on directly from the events of Logopolis; instead, the Doctor and his companions would have already left Earth. The story was to concern nuclear disarmament. Commissioned as Project '4G on 7 October 1980, the script proved unworkable, and producer John Nathan-Turner dropped the story on 19 February 1981. He then commissioned recently departed script editor Christopher H. Bidmead to write a replacement which became Castrovalva. This last minute change disrupted the shooting schedule, meaning that Castrovalva would be the fourth serial of the series filmed, though it would be the first transmitted.

The Psychrons
Written by Terence Greer, a scene breakdown for this four-part story was commissioned on 13 June 1980. It was finally rejected sometime after April 1981 and was originally submitted featuring the Fourth Doctor. It is not known if the idea's development extended to the point that Greer would have had to modify it to include the Fifth Doctor.

The Torson Triumvirate
Written by Andrew Smith, a scene breakdown for this four-part story set on present-day Earth was commissioned on 25 November 1980. The story was still under consideration in April 1981.

Submitted for season 20
Parasites
Written by Bill Lyons and also known as The Parasites, a scene breakdown was commissioned on 22 September 1981, with the scripts commissioned on 16 February & 23 April 1982 by which point it was being considered for Season 21.

Way Down Yonder
Written by Lesley Elizabeth Thomas, a scene breakdown for this four-part story was commissioned on 23 April 1981. The story was abandoned at some point after November 1981.

"Untitled storyline (Lee)"
Written by Tanith Lee, the scripts for this four-part story were commissioned on 6 February 1981.

Submitted for 20th anniversary special
The Six Doctors
Written by Robert Holmes, this story was planned as the 20th anniversary special. The 90-minute single-part story was commissioned on 2 August 1982 and would involve the various Doctors and companions drawn to the planet Maladoom where they are trapped by the Master who is working for the Cybermen. The Cybermen want to isolate the genetic material that permits Time Lords to time travel freely so that they can incorporate that information into their own biology. The First Doctor would be revealed as an android called "Doctor Bill", hence the title being The Six Doctors. Holmes made little headway with the script and withdrew from the project on 13 October 1982.

Submitted for season 21
Children of Seth

After completing Snakedance, Saward requested that writer Christopher Bailey devise another story. The initial outline for May Time was commissioned on 24 August 1982 and was about the Doctor and his companions arriving at the court of Byzantium. Full scripts were commissioned on 16 September 1982 with the new title Man-watch, but the scripts were dropped from production for unclear reasons. A second attempt at the story under the title Children of Seth was attempted as a Sixth Doctor story, for which the scripts commissioned on 14 July 1983. This failed because of Bailey's failure to devise a structure for the new doctor's new 45-minute episode format and a tangible villain for the Doctor to face. It was later adapted as The Children of Seth by Marc Platt for Big Finish's The Lost Stories in December 2011.

Circus of Destiny
Written by Ben Steed, this two-part story was delivered in January 1983. It was ultimately not taken forward.

The Darkness
Eric Pringle submitted this storyline for a four-part story to the production office in August 1981 alongside The Awakening, but only the latter was developed further. The story may have involved the Daleks.

The Dark Samurai
Written by Andrew Smith, this story was submitted to the production office around 1983 and was to have been set in early Nineteenth century Japan.

The Elite
Written by Barbara Clegg this was submitted in late 1982. It dealt with a race of intelligent youths controlled by a lone Dalek. It was later adapted by John Dorney for Big Finish's The Lost Stories in October 2011, which backdated the story to after the events of the Season 20 serial Arc of Infinity, with Nyssa and Tegan as companions of the Fifth Doctor.

Ghost Planet
Written by Robin Squire, this four-part story had a scene breakdown commissioned on 5 January 1983 and the scripts on 20 May 1983. The story may have been considered to incorporate the Sixth Doctor.

Hex
Written by Peter Ling & Hazel Adair, this story developed out of plans by producer Nathan-Turner to create a sequel to the 1960s soap opera Compact, entitled Impact. When, after drafting three or four scripts for the proposed Impact, Nathan-Turner informed the pair that plans for the soap had been cancelled, the producer offered them the opportunity to write for Doctor Who as a form of compensation. A scene breakdown (whittled down from six parts to four) was commissioned on 12 July 1983, but after three months of development on the scripts, during which the story was restructured into two 45-minute episodes, it was ultimately rejected. The plot involves the disappearance of various people on Earth, which leads the Doctor and Peri to the planet Hexagora where the Doctor becomes romantically involved with Queen Zafia who is trying to save the insect race of Hexagora from destruction through a plan to infiltrate and take over Earth. It was later adapted as Hexagora by Paul Finch for Big Finish's The Lost Stories with Tegan and Nyssa in November 2011.

The House That Ur-Cjak Built
Written by Andrew Stephenson, a scene breakdown was commissioned on 10 June 1982.

The Metraki
Written by Andrew Smith, this story was submitted to the production office around 1983. This storyline led to Smith being commissioned for The First Sontarans.

Nightmare Country
Written by Stephen Gallagher, this script was submitted in late 1982 but rejected by Saward on grounds of cost. The four-part story would involve the Doctor, Tegan and Turlough testing a Reality Simulator. This simulator projects a graveyard world overrun by the Vodyani who soon find a way out of the virtual reality and into the real world. Big Finish Productions produced an audio adaptation of this story, which was released on 14 November 2019.

The Place Where All Times Meet
Written by Colin Davis, a scene breakdown was commissioned on 10 June 1982. Proposed as a four-part adventure where people from different periods in history find themselves able to move between times in the English countryside.

Poison
Written by Rod Beacham, a screen breakdown was commissioned on 27 April 1982 and the scripts on 27 May 1982.

The Rogue TARDIS
Written by Barbara Clegg, this story was submitted in late 1982 and dealt with the Doctor searching for a missing Time Lord who has regenerated to merge with his TARDIS.

The SCI
Written by William Emms, this four-part storyline was discussed but not commissioned when Emms approached the production office in 1983. The story involved the populace of the planet Alden falling under mental domination.

The Underworld
Written by Barbara Clegg, this story was submitted in late 1982 and saw the Doctor travel down the River Styx in Ancient Greece where he would discover an alien race, the Hadeans, kidnapping the women of Greece due to their own race being rendered infertile.

Warmongers
Written by Marc Platt and Charles M. Stevens (a pseudonym for J. Jeremy Bentham), this story was submitted on spec in 1983 and was discussed with Saward but not commissioned. This story dealt with Sontarans and Rutans in England during the 1940s blitz.

The Zeldan
Written by William Emms, this four-part storyline was discussed but not commissioned when Emms approached the production office in 1983.

Sixth Doctor
Submitted for season 22
All scripts for this series were commissioned for the new 45-minute episode format.

Cat's Cradle
Written by Marc Platt, this was submitted to Saward in 1984 and rejected for being too ambitious, and too complex for Doctor Who budget. In early 1987, he revised his Cat’s Cradle story to script editor Andrew Cartmel, but the story still fell through due to the budget concerns once again. Platt later adapted the story as a novel for the Virgin New Adventures range in February 1992.

The First Sontarans
Written by Andrew Smith, a scene breakdown had been commissioned on 10 January 1984. Initially conceived as a four 25-minute episodes story, the two 45-minute episodes story would have been set in 1872, involve the Mary Celeste in some way, and would elaborate on the origins of the Sontaran-Rutan war. The First Sontarans was turned down due to the fact that the Sontarans were to appear in the Season 22 serial The Two Doctors. It was later adapted by Smith for Big Finish as part of their The Lost Stories series in July 2012.

The Guardians of Prophecy
Written by Johnny Byrne, a plot outline for this story, also known as The Place of Serenity, was submitted to the production office by Byrne in July 1983. The two-part story would have seen the Doctor visit the planet Serenity, which is part of the same union that Traken belonged to. The rulers of Serenity are assisted by a computer known as Prophecy and the villains of the piece, Auga and Mura, are attempting to overthrow the rulers. The story also would have seen the return of the Melkur. It was later adapted by Jonathan Morris for Big Finish as part of their The Lost Stories series in May 2012.

Leviathan
Written by Brian Finch. The scripts for the two-part story were commissioned as Livanthian on 14 August 1983, and later became Leviathan. Leviathan would have seen the Doctor arriving in what appeared to be medieval times. No official reason has been given for its late cancellation during Season 22, but the most likely explanation is budgetary reasons . Leviathan was later adapted by Paul Finch (Brian's son) for Big Finish as a late addition to their The Lost Stories series in January 2010, after Paul Finch contacted them about his father's script. Big Finish had not previously known about Leviathan.

The Macros
Written by Ingrid Pitt & Tony Rudlin was conceived of as a four-part Fifth Doctor story during the production of Season 21 before being quickly revised as a two-part Sixth Doctor tale. A script for the first episode only was commissioned as The Macro Men on 19 January 1984. It was later adapted by Pitt & Rudlin for Big Finish as part of their The Lost Stories series in June 2010.

Volvok
Written by Ian Marter, who had previously portrayed the character of Harry Sullivan in the series. The script for episode one only had been commissioned as Strange Encounter on 2 February 1984. The two-part story is thought to have dealt with the theme of hospital overcrowding.

"Untitled storyline (Bidmead)"
Written by Christopher H. Bidmead, a scene breakdown was commissioned on 19 June 1984. The story was submitted on the same day along with Bidmead's The Hollows of Time.

"Untitled storyline (Boucher)"
Written by Chris Boucher, a scene breakdown was commissioned on 7 February 1984.

The End of the Road
Written by Eric Saward, it had the Daleks either teaming up with or battling against another monster. The idea was abandoned when Terry Nation (the copyright holder of the Daleks) made a list of conditions which made writing difficult. The story was replaced by Revelation of the Daleks, Eric's later script.

The originally planned season 23

When Doctor Who was put on hiatus in February 1985, several completed scripts were already being prepared for the 1986 series (which would retain the format of thirteen 45-minute episodes). Others tales were still in the story-outline stage. All of these scripts were later abandoned to make way for The Trial of a Time Lord, when the series resumed in September 1986.

The Nightmare Fair

Written by Graham Williams, this two-part story was commissioned on 25 September 1984 as Arcade and was planned to open the original 23rd season. Nathan-Turner hoped to have Matthew Robinson direct the adventure, and it would have featured the return of the Celestial Toymaker. Williams wrote a novelisation of the script which was published by Target Books in May 1989. It was later adapted by John Ainsworth for Big Finish as part of their The Lost Stories series in November 2009.

The Ultimate Evil
Written by Wally K. Daly, this two-part story was planned to be the second story in the original 23rd season. Nathan-Turner hoped to have Fiona Cumming direct the adventure. Daly wrote a novelization of the script which was published by Target Books in August 1989. It was later adapted by Daly for Big Finish as part of their The Lost Stories series in November 2019.

Mission to Magnus

Written by Philip Martin, this two-part story was planned to be the fourth story recorded and third story transmitted in the original Season 23, and the story would have featured the Ice Warriors team up with Sil to ice the planet Magnus as a new home for the Ice Warriors but The Doctor and Peri notice this plan would ruin life for both of them and the Ice Warriors betray Sil... Nathan-Turner hoped to have Ron Jones direct the adventure. Martin wrote a novelization of the script which was published by Target Books in July 1990. It was later adapted by Martin for Big Finish as part of their The Lost Stories series in December 2009.

Yellow Fever and How to Cure It
Yellow Fever and How to Cure It was a three-part story by Robert Holmes that was scheduled to be recorded third and transmitted fourth in the original Season 23. It would have taken place in Singapore and featured the Autons as the monsters, with the Rani and/or the the Master appearing. Brigadier Lethbridge-Stewart would have also returned. The first episode was commissioned on 26 October 1984, before being put on hold. The entire story was subsequently commissioned on 6 February 1985. Nathan-Turner hoped to have Graeme Harper direct the adventure.

After the news of the hiatus, Holmes was asked by the production team to continue with the story but as six 25-minute episodes, this version seeing the removal of the Master from the plot. Holmes reportedly only completed a story outline before the planned Season 23 was completely cancelled.

In the Hollows of Time
Commissioned as a two-part story from Christopher H. Bidmead on 21 November 1984. Nathan-Turner hoped to have Matthew Robinson direct the adventure, which would have been Robinson's second story of Season 23. After the news of the hiatus, Bidmead was asked by the production team to continue with the story but as four 25-minute episodes. It was later adapted as The Hollows of Time by Bidmead for Big Finish as part of their The Lost Stories series in June 2010.

The Children of January
Written by Michael Feeney Callan, this story was commissioned on 5 February 1985. After the news of the hiatus, Callan was asked by the production team to continue with the story but as four 25-minute episodes but was backed up to the original 2 part-45-minute episodes. Nathan-Turner hoped to have Bob Gabriel direct the adventure, who directed some of the earliest episodes of EastEnders in 1985. It had been planned that an adaptation of this story would appear as part of Big Finish's The Lost Stories range, but fell through due to the author's other commitments and was replaced by The Macros.

Also submitted for original season 23
Dark Labyrinth
Written by David Banks, the story involved the Sixth Doctor and Peri encountering the Master in Ancient Crete, as well as a contingent of Cybermen. David Banks, who had played the Cyber Leader in three serials in the early 1980s, submitted this storyline around the time that 'Attack of the Cybermen' entered production in 1984. Script editor Eric Saward liked the idea, but felt that it would prove too expensive to film.

Doomwraiths
Written by Philip Martin, this story was submitted on 28 December 1983 and dealt with an alien race returning to Earth to discover their "humanity" experiment has failed. The story involved the TARDIS alerting the Doctor to the fact that a regeneration is in progress nearby, suggesting the presence of a fellow Timelord. The Doctor instead find the elite of the Doomwraiths emerging, reconstituted, as shimmering metal columns with many moving strips and a deadly purpose. The Wraiths find that human evolution has failed, and mankind has not taken on their form; they will thus release a plague to destroy humanity, relocate the missing section of genetic code and repopulate Earth themselves. The Doctor and Peri discover that the Doomwraiths themselves have a genetic flaw which gives them the impulse to destroy. The Doctor manages to destroy the discovered code block, but says that the Doomwraiths may have left their legacy on other worlds. On 9 March 1984, Saward noted that the story idea would need further development before he could assess it for commissioning.

 Flipback 
Written by David Banks.

Gallifrey
Gallifrey was a Pip & Jane Baker script for four 25-minute episodes that was commissioned on 11 March 1985 in the wake of the hiatus announcement, that reportedly would have dealt with the destruction of the Doctor's aforementioned home planet.

Iceberg
Written by David Banks, the writer proposed the story around the time that he was engaged to play the Cyberleader in Attack of the Cybermen. Banks later adapted the story as a novel for the Virgin New Adventures range in September 1993 featuring the Seventh Doctor.

League of the Tancreds
Written by Peter Grimwade, this two-part story was commissioned on 13 August 1984 and abandoned due to budgetary concerns on 8 November 1984 after the completion of a scene breakdown. It was later used as the outline for Birthright by Nigel Robinson.

Meltdown
Written by Gary Hopkins, this story reunites the Doctor with former companion Victoria Waterfield, now crusading against nuclear waste. It was later adapted as Power Play by Hopkins for Big Finish's The Lost Stories range in June 2012.

Point of Entry
Written by Barbara Clegg, this storyline involved the Doctor and Peri in Elizabethan London as an alien race, the Omnim, return via an Aztec knife. It was also to feature Christopher Marlowe. It was later adapted by Marc Platt for Big Finish as part of their The Lost Stories series in April 2010.

Space Sargasso
Written by Philip Martin, this story was submitted on 28 December 1983 and had the TARDIS pulled to a spaceship graveyard controlled by the Master. On 9 March 1984 Saward felt that the story idea needed further work before it could be considered for commissioning.

Valley of Shadows
Written by Philip Martin, this story was submitted on 28 December 1983 and had the Doctor travel into the Egyptian underworld to save Peri. On 9 March 1984 Saward felt that the story idea needed further work before it could be considered for commissioning.

"Untitled storyline (Pritchard)"
Written by Bill Pritchard.

"Untitled storyline (Wolfman)"
Written by Jonathan Wolfman.

The Trial of a Time Lord candidates
After the decision was taken to cancel all the stories previously commissioned for Season 23, new stories were sought for the shortened 14-episode series. The plan was for three production blocks, divided up into two four-episode lots and one block of six episodes. Robert Holmes was assigned the opening four-part story and Philip Martin the second four-part story. The final six episodes were to be broken up into three two-part stories.

Attack from the Mind
Writer David Halliwell was approached by Eric Saward in early July 1985 as a prospective writer for the "new" Season 23. Halliwell submitted his untitled first draft of the then untitled two-part story for episodes 9 & 10 to the production office in late July 1985. The story dealt with a conflict between the ugly looking Freds and the beautiful Penelopeans. Work on a second draft began on 14 August 1985 and was completed by 22 August 1985, with a third draft submitted on 11 September 1985. Saward spent much time with Halliwell on further drafts, changing the name of the Freds to Trikes. The fourth revision was delivered on 26 September 1985 and 7 October 1985 saw a fifth draft arrive at the production office. Halliwell received a letter from Saward on 18 October 1985, advising him that Attack from the Mind had been cancelled.

The Second Coming
Written by Jack Trevor Story. Story was invited to the same series briefing as David Halliwell, and this two-part story episodes 11 & 12 was meant to share sets with Attack from the Mind as well as being linked narratively. The plot centred on a man playing a saxophone inside an empty gasometer. In complete contrast to Halliwell, who submitted a total five drafts of Attack from the Mind, Story never got round to submitting even his first draft of scripts for The Second Coming, and both stories were cancelled by script editor Eric Saward in October 1985.

With the dismissal of Halliwell and Story's scripts, Saward looked to replace them with a single four-part adventure.

Pinacotheca
Written by Christopher H. Bidmead, the story was commissioned on 29 October 1985 as The Last Adventure, this replaced the scripts by David Halliwell and Jack Trevor Story as episodes 9 – 12 with second draft scripts of all four episodes delivered by 9 January 1986. The story was dropped on 7 February 1986, rejected by Eric Saward.

Paradise Five
Written by P.J. Hammond, the story was commissioned as End of Term on 10 February 1986 as a replacement for Pinacotheca for episodes 9 – 12. It involved the Doctor investigating the resort of Paradise Five, while Mel goes undercover as a hostess. When this script was rejected by producer John Nathan-Turner, it was replaced in turn by Pip & Jane Baker's Terror of the Vervoids. It was later adapted as Paradise 5 by Andy Lane for Big Finish as part of their The Lost Stories series in March 2010, which scrapped all of the Trial scenes from the original script, replaced Mel with Peri, and backdated Paradise 5 to before the events of The Trial of a Time Lord.

Time Inc
Time Inc was the title for the concluding two-part story-arc as to have originally been written by Robert Holmes for episodes 13 & 14 when commissioned on 4 February 1986. However, Holmes was unable to work on the script past the first part due to his untimely death on 24 May 1986. Script editor Eric Saward was tasked with completing the story, his version of the script ending with the Doctor and the Valeyard locked in battle in the time vortex and no clear victor. This ending was disapproved by series producer John Nathan-Turner as being too down-beat and would end the show on an inconclusive moment should the BBC decide to cancel the series, with Saward annoyed by what he saw as Nathan-Turner reneging on what Saward and the late Holmes had long agreed for the series ending. John Nathan-Turner subsequently commissioned Pip & Jane Baker to write the final episode after Saward had withdrawn permission for his version of episode 14 to be used following the rejection of his proposed ending. The versions of episodes 13 and 14 that were transmitted were subsequently renamed as "The Ultimate Foe" on the final scripts, an early title that had been used for Pip and Jane Baker's transmitted episodes 9-12 serial that became Terror of the Vervoids.

Submitted for Season 24
During The Trial of a Time Lord, plans were underway for Season 24 with Colin Baker, although it was unclear whether or not the show was going to cancelled or who was to be in charge if it wasn't. Once John Nathan-Turner knew that Colin Baker had been fired, plans were put in place for a regeneration story.

Mel introduction story
According to his book Doctor Who: The Companions (published at about the time The Trial of a Time Lord was broadcast), Producer John Nathan-Turner intended to chronicle the Doctor's first meeting with Melanie Bush in a later episode. The subsequent dismissal of Colin Baker from the role of the Doctor rendered this potential storyline moot.

Untitled Pirate Storyline
Written by Pip and Jane Baker, it was planned as Colin Baker's final story but was quickly replaced by Strange Matter.

Strange Matter
Written by Pip and Jane Baker, Time and the Rani (originally Strange Matter) was planned to be Colin Baker's final story. Once it was clear that Colin didn't want to return, it was subsequently rewritten as the Seventh Doctor's opening story with the regeneration occurring pre-titles.

Seventh Doctor
Submitted for season 25

Knight Fall
Written by Ben Aaronovitch, this story concerned privatisation. This idea was submitted in May 1987, the then script editor Andrew Cartmel liked some of the concepts, but he felt that it was generally inappropriate for Doctor Who, and that there were too many supporting characters. However, Andrew Cartmel encouraged Ben Aaronovitch to pitch more stories, and led to the story Transit.

Transit
Written by Ben Aaronovitch. It is unknown why it was dropped but it was replaced by Remembrance of the Daleks. Ben later adapted Transit as a novel for the Virgin New Adventures series.

Submitted for season 26
Alixion
Written by Robin Mukherjee, this three-part story had been considered for season 26 as the "spare" script should another planned story become no longer suitable. The adventure was to take place on a monastic planet inhabited by humans and large beetles. The humans were monks who worked to provide a special elixir that enhanced intelligence. This elixir would be produced by the beetles feeding on intelligent beings. The abbot of the monastery wants to feed the Doctor to the beetles in order to produce a more potent elixir for himself. The script was not completed beyond a partial storyline. Mukherjee was unsure how events would have been resolved beyond a contest of wills between the Doctor and the abbot. It was also up for consideration as the final serial of Season 27 where it would have also included the Doctor playing a series of deadly games, and would have likely led to the Seventh Doctor's regeneration and Sylvester McCoy's departure.

In an interesting historical footnote, Mukherjee would've been the first person of colour writer to work on the programme (something later accomplished by Malorie Blackman 29 years later, with the episode Rosa.)

Avatar
Written by David A. McIntee, this was a four-part Lovecraftian horror story set in Arkham, New England in 1927, although McIntee later began a rewrite to shift the action to Cornwall. The story involved alien bodysnatchers who could only inhabit the bodies of the dead. The villain of the piece would discover the remains of a Silurian god and try and clone itself a new body from the fossilized body.

Illegal Alien
Written by Mike Tucker & Robert Perry, this was a three-part Cybermen story set in war-torn London of the 1940s. They had completed the first two episodes in script form and the final episode as a storyline, and were planning to submit it during the start of production on season 26. Fellow writer Ben Aaronovitch intercepted the script, suggesting that submitting to script editor Andrew Cartmel a World War II script when he was currently already editing something similar (The Curse of Fenric) was a mistake and to instead submit it for the following series. Tucker & Perry later adapted the story as a novel for the BBC Past Doctors range in October 1997.

Lungbarrow
Written by Marc Platt. The story was to feature the Doctor and Ace, who arrive at the former's ancestral home on the planet Gallifrey and meet his relatives. However, Platt and Andrew Cartmel came to the agreement that the storyline didn't work for TV and it was replaced by Platt's late script, Ghost Light, which ultimately had to be refocused to revealing more of Ace's back story due to producer John Nathan-Turner arguing that the script was "too revealing" of the Doctor's origins. Platt later adapted the story as a novel for the Virgin New Adventures range in March 1997.

Shrine
In 1988 writer Marc Platt discussed with script editor Andrew Cartmel an idea inspired by Leo Tolstoy's War and Peace, concerning stone-headed aliens looking for their God-King in Tsarist 19th Century Russia.

Under consideration for season 27
Before the original Doctor Who series reached its conclusion, some tentative plans had been made for a proposed 27th season under the assumption that it would maintain the then-current pattern of two four-part and two three-part stories. As noted in each entry, Big Finish Productions has produced audio adaptations of several scripts as part of their The Lost Stories releases. The safecracking companion introduced in Crime of the Century (see below), who was never named during the planning, has now been given a name, that of Raine Creevey, and she is portrayed by Beth Chalmers.

Bad Destination
The opening three-part, studio-bound story was to be written by Ben Aaronovitch; a space opera featuring a race of samurai insect-like aliens called the Metatraxi. Bad Destination was to open with Ace in the captain's chair of a starship, and the story would concern the politics of humanitarian aid. The Metatraxi were originally conceived as part of a stage play entitled War World. Bad Destination was later adapted by Aaronovitch and Cartmel for Big Finish's The Lost Stories range in July 2011 under the name Earth Aid (a title invented by Dave Owen for his "27 up" article in DWM).

Thin Ice
This four-parter, the second story of the proposed series, was to have been written by Marc Platt and was due to feature Ice Warriors in a London of 1968. It would have seen the departure of Ace to the Prydonian Academy to become a Time Lord.. The story was to introduce a character with underworld connections who was intended to become a recurring character similar to the Brigadier. The character would have a daughter born at the conclusion of the adventure who would be named by the Doctor. The plot would have featured an Ice Warrior's armour in the London Dungeon and two reincarnated Warriors continuing a long rivalry. Platt also intended to have bikers being controlled by the Ice Warriors (and wearing similar helmets), scenes on a terraformed pastoral Mars, and a more mystical bent to the aliens while deepening their history. Marc Platt has revealed that the name Ice Time was "only ever invented for an article in Doctor Who Magazine" (Dave Owen's "27 up" article). It was later adapted by Platt for Big Finish's The Lost Stories range in April 2011. An unrelated television story by the same name was aired in 2017 as part of Series 10.

Action At a Distance
Was to have been written by Andrew Cartmel, and would have introduced a cat burglar/safecracker as the next companion. The character with underworld connections from Thin Ice would be featured as an older individual and the father of the new companion. Action At a Distance was later adapted by Cartmel for Big Finish's The Lost Stories range in May 2011 as Crime of the Century (another title invented by Owen for "27 up"). The audio Earth Aid makes references that this story takes place before it. This version also features Ace.

Blood and Iron
Cartmel had wanted to pen a story of his own. He planned this to include Seventh Doctor's regeneration. Blood and Iron was later adapted by Cartmel for Big Finish's The Lost Stories range in June 2011 as Animal (another title invented by Owen for "27 up").

Hostage
Written by Neil Penswick, this was a three-part futuristic thriller in which a group of soldiers are hunting down two shape-changing criminals called Butler and Swarfe. The cliffhanger to part one had Swarfe changing into a monster who then went on the hunt in part two. Penswick later adapted some material from this for his Virgin New Adventures novel The Pit in March 1993.

Night Thoughts
Written by Edward Young, this is a horror story set in an isolated house. It would feature a group of university staff, one who was a cripple, trapped in the house during winter. One of the characters would turn out to be a murderer. The story took its name and theme from the poem Night-Thoughts by Edward Young, namesake of the story's writer. It was later adapted by Young for Big Finish in February 2006. The adaptation featured the Seventh Doctor and Ace, as well as Big Finish-original companion Hex.

A School for Glory
Written by Tony Etchells & an unidentified writer, this was to be set during the Great War. The narrative was planned to alternate between the trenches and a British country house doubling as an army academy.AvatarWritten by David A McIntee, the story was originally to be set in Arkham, New England yet was rewritten to be set in Cornwall. The story would have focused on Alien Bodysnatchers who are only able to inhabit the dead. The main villain of the story would have discovered the remains of a Silurian God and attempted to clone it.  Mcintee later adapted his script into the Virgin New Adventures novel Doctor Who: White Darkness in 1993.

Submitted for 30th anniversary special
Destination: Holocaust
Written by David Roden, this story involved the Doctor meeting with the Brigadier Lethbridge-Stuart fighting against Cybermen in a church. This story was dropped in favor of Dimensions in Time.

Endgame
Written by David Roden, this two-part story, would feature the Doctor and the Brigadier trying to save the Doctor's previous reincarnations from the powers of the Celestial Toymaker. Michael Gough turned down the role, and the story was replaced by Dimensions in Time.

Lost in the Dark Dimension
The first time the idea of a special video-only anniversary special was mooted was in a memo Nathan-Turner wrote to Head of Video Production Penny Mills on 18 February 1992. With Tom Baker not averse to appearing should conditions be met, serious thought was given to an original production and there was a meeting in June 1992 to discuss the concept of the special; by 21 July 1992 writer Adrian Rigelsford (later joined by Joanna McCaul) had completed an initial outline for the story entitled Timeflyers. Shortly afterwards the project was given the cover name The Environment Roadshow. A production office was opened for the project in the first week of September 1992 with shooting planned for January–February 1993. The script was sent to Peter Cregeen on 22 March 1993, indicating at the same time that Graeme Harper was being looked at as a potential director for the special. However, issues with budget plagued the production and shooting slipped to taking place November–December 1993 with a final delivery date of 14 March 1994. Around mid-May Cregeen indicated that he'd like to see the special broadcast on the BBC in November 1993. By the end of May 1993, the project was now being referred to as The Dark Dimension before a new working title of Lost in the Dark Dimension was settled on. Harper was contracted as the director of the special in June 1993 and intended Rik Mayall to play the part of the villain, Hawkspur. What was hoped to be the final shooting script was completed on 21 June 1993 and with the production now aimed for broadcast than a direct-to-video release, Alan Yentob gave the special the green light with the plan to have the completed project delivered by 27 November 1993 but by the start of July 1993, budget issues continued to plague the production and on 9 July 1993 the project was officially cancelled. With the project sunk, the thirtieth anniversary was instead celebrated with the light-hearted Children in Need charity special Dimensions in Time and the documentary 30 Years in the TARDIS. The BBC press release had hinted at the plot with the following:

Eighth Doctor
1990s US reboot – Leekley bible
Early in the process that was to lead to the 1996 Doctor Who film, Universal Television had Amblin Entertainment produce a writers' bible which detailed John Leekley's proposed pilot and episodes of a new series. The new series would have established a new continuity rather than following on from the classic series, and the bible reused many elements from the classic series. It is unclear whether clearance could have been obtained for all the episodes detailed, as the costs would likely have fallen to the BBC.

The pilot was to feature the half-human Doctor seeking his father, Ulysses, through various time periods—contemporary Gallifrey (where Borusa dies and is merged with the TARDIS, and the Master becomes leader of the Time Lords), England during the Blitz, Ancient Egypt, and Skaro (where the Daleks are being created). Other proposed episodes in the bible included The Pirates, in which the Doctor teamed up with Blackbeard, and several remakes of stories from the classic series, including:
 The Talons of Weng-Chiang, set in New York City
 Earthshock, featuring the "Cybs" (Leekley's more piratical version of the Cybermen)
 Horror of Fang Rock The Celestial Toymaker, who was to have been under the control of the Master.
 Don't Shoot, I'm the Doctor, a more historically accurate remake of The Gunfighters Tomb of the Cybs, a remake of The Tomb of the Cybermen in which the Cybs are awoken by the Master
 The Yeti, a remake of The Abominable Snowmen featuring the Dalai Lama and Sir Edmund Hillary
 The Ark in SpaceEarlier versions of the bible included, among others:
 The Cybs, a story set on Mars in which the Doctor escapes capture by hiding in a gold mine
 A remake of The Sea Devils, set in a Louisiana oil rig
 The Outcasts, in which the Cybs would attack Gallifreyan outcasts
 The Land of Fear, a conflation of The Reign of Terror and The Claws of Axos A remake of The Dæmons, set in Salem, Massachusetts
 A completed version of Shada, which would have introduced Romana and Professor Chronotis as Romana's uncle.

Leekley's scripts were not well received at Amblin or elsewhere; and in September 1994, he was removed from the project.

Ninth Doctor
"Untitled storyline (Abbott)"
Written by Paul Abbott, this episode was intended for episode 11 of Series 1. With Jack Harkness having joined the Ninth Doctor and Rose Tyler, Rose feels left out. But when they land in Pompeii in 79 AD, Jack discovers that Rose's life has been manipulated by the Doctor in an experiment to create the perfect companion. Abbott's commitment to Shameless and other projects led to him dropping out of the episode. Russell T Davies took over and wrote "Boom Town" in its place and the Volcano Day setting was reused in Series 4's The Fires of Pompeii. 

Mr. Sandman
Written by Mark Gatiss, this episode concerned an alien entity living inside a song, anyone who listened to the melody would turn into faceless creatures. It evolved into The Idiot's Lantern, and concepts from the story would later be reused in Sleep No More.

Tenth Doctor
"Untitled Episode"
For Series 2 in 2006, an unnamed writer penned an episode concerning Queen Victoria getting an alien insect in her eye. However, the idea was abandoned and Russell T Davies stepped in and wrote a brand new Queen Victoria story for the same slot which became "Tooth and Claw". The setting was eventually changed to the Torchwood Estate and the alien became a werewolf.

Doctor Who and the Green Knight
The revived Doctor Who series was to feature a script by Stephen Fry, set in the 1920s. Rumours appeared on the BBC's websites shortly after the airing of the new Series 1 and the story was pencilled in as the eleventh episode of Series 2. According to a video diary entry by David Tennant, Fry attended the very first cast read-through for Series 2, indicating that his script was still under consideration at that point. Due to budgetary constraints, the episode was moved to Series 3 and replaced by Fear Her. The story was subsequently abandoned, as Fry did not have spare time for the rewriting necessary to replace Rose with Martha, due to his commitments to the series Kingdom. Fry said, "They asked me to do a series and I tried, but I just ran out of time, and so I wrote a pathetic letter of "I'm sorry I can't do this" to Davies."

"Untitled Episode"
After 1920s was moved to Series 3 and before Fear Her was decided upon, Russell T Davies considered at least one more "spare" storyline for the episode 11 slot. It involved a villain who has discovered how to drain things of their beauty, and has reduced his planet to a sterile grey landscape.
It is unknown who was to write this script or even whether it was a proto-Fear Her before Matthew Graham had fleshed out the plot fully. 

Century House
A "companion-lite" episode, Century House was written by Tom MacRae for Series 3 of the revived show. The Doctor was to appear on a live broadcast of Most Haunted, investigating a house haunted by the "Red Widow", with Martha Jones watching at home as a framing device. The episode did not fit into the production schedule, and was pushed back to Series 4 and reworked such that the show was watched by Donna Noble and her mother Sylvia. Due to dissatisfaction with the premise, and to avoid two comedic episodes in the same series, the episode was dropped and replaced with Davies' Midnight. This premise was expanded upon for the Doctor Who Audio Drama, No Place.  An audio drama of Century House by VocaLAB Productions was released in 2022, featuring regular Tenth Doctor impersonator Elliott Crossley.

"Untitled storyline (Davies)"
Russell T Davies scrapped a glass bowl storyline for the Partners in Crime slot in Series 4, as he decided this would make the story too contained, and that wasn't the tone he wanted. In his book The Writer's Tale, Davies remarked that he was glad he abandoned the idea, because The Simpsons Movie had a similar premise.

The Suicide Exhibition
During the Second World War, a Nazi task force assaults the Natural History Museum in London, which has been overrun by monsters. Later action would have involved the discovery of a secret chamber beneath the museum. This episode was written by Mark Gatiss and planned to air in the fourth series of Doctor Who, but was replaced by The Fires of Pompeii. Elements of the story were later reused in Steven Moffat's The Big Bang, the finale of Series 5.

"Untitled 2008 Christmas special"
On Christmas Eve, an alien creature attaches itself to author J.K. Rowling. Suddenly, the real world is replaced by a magical reality influenced by the writer's own imagination. The Doctor must battle witches and wizards to reach Rowling and put the world to rights.

"A Midwinter's Tale" (Davies/Ford)"
A family goes to a hotel with their gran, (a role which Davies hoped would have been played by Helen Mirren). Gran hates the family so much that she wants them to disappear as they then do. She's stuck in the hotel until the Doctor appears in a lift. Russell T Davies thought of this idea to pick for a potential Christmas Special for 2009 to give to Phil Ford to write. Phil decided to use some aliens in the plot he was given and a chase down Buckingham Palace. However, Russell decided that the better choice was 'Christmas on Mars' which then became "The Waters of Mars".

"Untitled Final David Tennant Special"
This was a storyline that Russell T Davies thought up as a final one-part special for David Tennant on Doctor Who, (this was going to air around Easter 2010, near the time Series 5 would be airing). The plot would have been that the Doctor finds a spaceship with an alien family on board (Russell mockingly titled them 'The Prostetix Family'.) where the ship was broken, in the special he would have to sacrifice his life to save this family. This was a choice of a plotline which was also brought up with a two part special that then became "The End of Time" that he told to Jane Tranter and Julie Gardner. The Prostetix family was kept in the special but were changed to be the Vinvocci, Addams and Rossiter.

Eleventh Doctor
"Untitled storyline (Graham)"
Written by Matthew Graham and planned for the 2010 series, to be about an old people's home and a lighthouse that was a spaceship. Trips to the US, and Graham's work on Ashes to Ashes precluded him from developing the storyline to script stage.

 "Untitled storyline (Shearman)" 
During an Interview, Robert Shearman revealed he was asked to write an episode for Series 5 by Steven Moffat. He attended the read through. He left due to feeling that he could "never get the story right".

"Death to the Doctor"
Written by Gareth Roberts. Before settling upon the storyline that would become The Lodger, Roberts initially developed a different storyline for the 2010 series which would have featured a disgraced Sontaran called Strom. This idea reached draft stage before being abandoned altogether. However the idea of Strom was later recycled into Sontaran Commander Strax, who first appeared in A Good Man Goes to War and became a recurring character.

"Love and War"
Paul Cornell was invited by showrunner Steven Moffat to work on a script idea for inclusion in series 5. Initially, Moffat suggested the possibility of adapting Cornell's Virgin New Adventure novel "Love and War", originally published in 1992. Big Finish would later produce an audio adaption of this novel twenty years later in 2012.

 "Fear Itself" 
Cornell's Doctor Who short story "The Hopes and Fears of All the Years" was also considered as a possibility for adaption, previously published by The Daily Telegraph in 2007. The short story involves the Doctor visiting a little boy every Christmas Day through to adulthood with the foreknowledge that the Doctor is destined to save the boy's life. A similar idea was later used in Moffat's 2010 Christmas special "A Christmas Carol", much to Cornell's annoyance at the time. As it was clear that Cornell would not be writing the Christmas special, it was decided to use the boy's birthday instead. Cornell worked on six drafts of the script before it became apparent that the cost of depicting many different time periods, including two world wars, in one episode would be too prohibitive. It was then hoped by the production team that the idea could be reworked for inclusion in Series 6, however this came to nothing.

 Twelfth Doctor 

 "Untitled vampire story (Cornell)" 
Paul Cornell was invited by script editor Derek Ritchie to attend pitch session for Series 8. At which, Cornell proposed a storyline that involved Clara, later the Doctor at Moffat's suggestion, being turned into a vampire. However, this came to nothing.

 "How the Monk Got His Habit" 
Intended to be written by Peter Harness, this story would have seen the return of the Meddling Monk. The intent was for him to be played by Matt Berry, and would revolve around an encounter with Rasputin. It was never made, but Harness later published the opening page of a script on his Twitter account. Elements of this story would be used by Chris Chibnall for 2022 Thirteenth Doctor story "The Power of the Doctor", where a different renegade Time Lord impersonates Rasputin.

 "Pride and Prejudice and Daleks" 
After the submission of his untitled vampire story, Paul Cornell submitted a storyline idea titled "Pride and Prejudice and Daleks", which would have taken place in the Land of Fiction, previously seen in the 1968 story "The Mind Robber". However, Cornell was informed that the idea was too similar to a script already in development by another writer and so they would not be able to develop the idea with Cornell any further.

 "Sleep No More sequel" 
Written by Mark Gatiss. After Sleep No More aired, Gatiss had initially developed a sequel that would have pre-empted the story by being set thousands of years before Gagan Rassmussen's Morpheus process experiments at the Le Verrier, where the Doctor discovers the same process being experimented with on Earth. The script was changed once Gatiss had found out that showrunner Steven Moffat was leaving and the story he was doing would be his last for the show; he instead pitched Empress of Mars.

 Thirteenth Doctor 

 "Safari" 
Written by Ed Hime. This story was based on one of the very early ideas that Ed Hime had in the first writer's room for Series 11. The storyline had played out in an ex-military compound that had been turned into a safari lodge on a war devastated planet that was home to the Blox/Damaje. The species made for a tourist attraction for the tourists that had wanted to see the rare life-form. A draft of the script was set on a planet named Kryll. The story was then shelved for Series 11 in early 2017 as Ed decided to write It Takes You Away before transforming the idea into what would become Orphan 55 in 2018.

 "Untitled Pirate Story (Flux)" 

During the storylining for the six part serial Flux; Chris Chibnall initially planned on one of the chapters focusing on pirates. He later stated that ‘for all sorts of reasons this didn’t pan out’. The idea of a pirate storyline 
would appear after Flux in the form of Legend of the Sea Devils.

 "Untitled 2022 special" 

Whilst planning out the 2022 specials, Chris Chibnall had originally planned for the 2022 New Years special to be set on board a moving bullet train through space. However, when it was realised that he would not have enough time to allow the production team to build the set in time for the production of the 2022 New Years special, he decided to create Eve of the Daleks as a replacement. A version of the original idea would later appear at the beginning of the 2022 Centenary special, The Power of the Doctor.

Unmade television spin-offs
Several proposals for Doctor Who spin-offs have been proposed, including one featuring the Doctor's friends Professor George Litefoot and Henry Gordon Jago from The Talons of Weng Chiang,

Young Doctor Who
A children's show featuring "Young Doctor Who" was vetoed by Russell T Davies and replaced by The Sarah Jane Adventures The series was pitched as a series focusing on The Doctor as a teenage boy, supposedly building sonic screwdrivers and expressing his love for the universe. The series never reached production due to the worry that it would ruin the mystery surrounding the Doctor's origins. Other productions proceeded further along.

The Daleks
On 1 November 1966, Dalek creator Terry Nation pitched a spin-off series The Daleks to the BBC, writing a thirty-minute teleplay entitled "The Destroyers" as a possible pilot episode for an American coproduction. The Daleks was to have focused on the adventures of the SSS. Lead characters included agents Captain Jack Corey, David Kingdom, his sister Sara Kingdom (from the Doctor Who story The Daleks' Master Plan, in which Kingdom died) and Mark Seven, an android. On 22 November 1966, the BBC informed Nation that they were no longer interested in the project. The pilot episode was adapted by Nicholas Briggs and John Dorney for Big Finish's The Lost Stories range for an audio story released in December 2010 and included on The Second Doctor Boxset, although it did not feature the Doctor himself.

Nelvana cartoon series

In 1990, following the cancellation of the live action series, the BBC approached the Canadian animation house Nelvana to propose an animated continuation of the show. The cartoon series was to feature an unspecified new Doctor, incorporating elements of various BBC series Doctors. It was not to be more oriented towards young audience than the live action series; rather, it was intended to be a continuation of the cancelled series in animated form in order to save costs, with design elements that would promote merchandise sales.

According to Nelvana's Ted Bastien: "We went through a lot of development on it, then we were scripting and storyboarding it and about four scripts had been written. It happened really fast".

Concept art was prepared depicting several possible versions of the Doctor based on actors such as Peter O'Toole, Jeff Goldblum and Christopher Lloyd with elements of the wardrobes of previous Doctors. Production sketches also showed new versions of allies such as K-9 and enemies such as the Daleks and Cybermen. The Master was to be "half-man, half robot with a cybernetic bird accessory and a face modeled after Sean Connery". The show was also to feature female companions from Earth, and space battles which the BBC would not have been able to afford for the live action series.

The series would have been Nelvana's biggest show to date. According to Bastien, "it was pulled out from under us" after a British animation studio told the BBC that it could do what Nelvana intended for a much lower price. The project did not proceed further and no pilot was produced.

K-9 and Company

Elisabeth Sladen was approached to return to Doctor Who as Sarah Jane Smith to help with the transition between Tom Baker and Peter Davison, but resisted the offer. Following the outcry after K-9 was removed from the show, producer John Nathan-Turner proposed a spin-off featuring the two characters. A single episode, "A Girl's Best Friend", was produced as a pilot for a proposed series, and broadcast by BBC1 as a Christmas special on 28 December 1981, but the series was not taken up. The basic premise of a series centered on Sarah Jane Smith was reused by Big Finish with the Sarah Jane Smith audio series and in the TV Series The Sarah Jane Adventures just over 25 years later.

Rose Tyler: Earth Defence
When it was decided that Billie Piper would leave the series at the end of Series 2, executive producer and head writer Russell T Davies considered giving her character Rose Tyler her own 90-minute spin-off production, Rose Tyler: Earth Defence, with the possibility of such a special becoming an annual Bank Holiday event. The special would have picked up from Rose's departure in Doomsday in which Rose joins the Torchwood Institute of a parallel Earth. The special was officially commissioned by Peter Fincham, the Controller of BBC One, and assigned a production budget. Davies changed his mind while filming Piper's final scenes for Series 2 of Doctor Who. He would later call Earth Defence "a spin-off too far," and decided that for the audience to be able to see Rose when the Doctor could not would spoil the ending of Doomsday. The production was cancelled. Davies said Piper had been told about the idea, but the project ended before she was formally approached about starring in it. The plot element of Tyler working with an alternative Earth's Torchwood to defend the Earth would be revisited towards the end of Series 4 in 2008.

Television spin-off series
The Sarah Jane Adventures
Series 1
"Untitled storyline (Gladwin)"
Written by Phil Gladwin. A story idea proposed for the fifth and sixth episodes of the first series. It involved an inventor creating an invention that would attract the attention of a passing alien vessel. The alien would kidnap the inventor, with the son offering to take his father's place. Elements of the idea were transferred into the story of Warriors of Kudlak.

Series 2
"The Trial of Sarah Jane Smith"
Written by Phil Ford. A story idea considered for the first and second episodes of the second series. It would have followed the events of the first series finale, with the rain going up in Bannerman Road. Sarah Jane would have been captured by the Judoon, to be placed on trial where old enemies of Sarah Jane would have been against her with a humanoid form of Mr Smith to defend her. The story was abandoned in favour of producing The Last Sontaran, with the idea of a humanoid form of Mr Smith to appear in the story Meet Mr. Smith.

Series 4
"Untitled storyline (Ford)"
Written by Phil Ford. A story idea considered for the first and second episodes of the fourth series. Set at Park Vale Comprehensive School, it would have concerned an Aztec priestess who had lived for thousands of years and was now working there as an English teacher.

Don't Sit Too Close to the Screen
Written by Joseph Lidster. A story idea considered for the third and fourth episodes of the fourth series. It involved a new children's television show that causes its viewer to become possessed. The aliens responsible harness electrical impulses in the viewers' brains, their aim being to eradicate humanity so that they can live uninterrupted in the electricity.

Supermarket Sweep
Written by Joseph Lidster. A story idea considered for the third and fourth episodes of the fourth series. It concerned an alien operating out of a supermarket with a voice coming over a tannoy into the empty store. The focus of story would be Luke and K9, with Luke combating the alien alone like the 1988 action movie Die Hard.

Underground
Written by Joseph Lidster. A story idea considered for the third and fourth episodes of the fourth series. It was based upon the old childhood game of not standing on the cracks between paving slabs.

Wallpaper
Written by Joseph Lidster. A story idea considered for the third and fourth episodes of the fourth series. It was based upon the notion of "faces" which people used to be able to see in patterned wallpaper. While redecorating, one of the Bannerman Road gang was to strip some paint off a wall and reveal old wallpaper underneath. Faces would appear on the wallpaper; these would be aliens from another dimension trying to arrive on Earth, literally taking shape in walls and stepping through them. It was noted that this notion could be adapted for patterns in wooden floors and doors.

"Untitled storyline (Roberts)"
Written by Gareth Roberts. A story idea considered for the seventh and eighth episodes of the fourth series. Sarah Jane would have, as a result of a lightning storm, come face to face with her father who has been dead for over 55 years.

The Children of Blackmere Rise
Written by Rupert Laight. A story idea considered for the ninth and tenth episodes of the fourth series. It would have seen Rani investigating a strange council estate, as part of her Journalism course, to find all its inhabitants possessed by an alien egg.

The Web of Lies
Written by Gary Russell. A story idea considered for the eleventh and twelfth episodes of the fourth series. It would have seen Sarah Jane being controlled by a trio of giant spiders from Metabelis III previously featured in the Doctor Who story Planet of the Spiders in which Sarah Jane had appeared.

Sarah Jane and the Return of the Spiders
Written by Joseph Lidster. A variant on Gary Russell's "The Web of Lies" proposal.

Servant of the Spiders
Written by Gareth Roberts and Clayton Hickman. A second variant on Gary Russell's "The Web of Lies" proposal.

Miracle on Bannerman Road
Written by Gareth Roberts and Clayton Hickman. It was planned that series four would conclude with a Christmas special. It would have been a pastiche of Charles Dickens' A Christmas Carol, with Sarah Jane being shown Christmas past, present and future by a guide. Tom Baker (who had played the Fourth Doctor) was considered at one point for the role of the guide. One of the reasons it might have been dropped is because the Doctor Who episode, A Christmas Carol, which was another Doctor Who-inspired version of the original story, aired the same December this episode was planned for.

Everyone's Asleep
Written by Gareth Roberts. A story idea considered for the fourth series. An alien causes the entire population of the UK to fall asleep in order to execute a bizarre plan. This idea later formed the basis for The Empty Planet.

Sarah Jane Goes Back to the Future
Written by Joseph Lidster. A story idea considered for the fourth series. Rani, Clyde and Luke return to the 1970s in order to save the lives of Rani's parents.

School Trip
Written by Gareth Roberts. A story idea considered for the fourth series. During a school trip, the youngsters find an alien in distress and have to help it without revealing its presence to the rest of their friends. This notion was conceived as a "Sarah Jane-lite" narrative which would allow Elisabeth Sladen a break in production.

Time Team
Written by Gareth Roberts. A story idea considered for the fourth series and inspired by the Channel 4 archaeology series Time Team. An archaeological dig would have discovered Sarah Jane's distinctive Nissan Figaro from where it had been buried thousands of years ago.

Trinity Wells Investigates
Written by Gareth Roberts. A story idea considered for the fourth series, it would have seen the character of Trinity Wells, an American news anchor who had appeared in regular cameo appearances on Doctor Who, investigating a series of strange events occurring in Ealing and surrounding Sarah Jane.

"Untitled storyline (Roberts)"
Written by Gareth Roberts. A story idea considered for the fourth series, it would have seen Rani's mother and father being abducted by the Russian counterpart of Torchwood.

Series 5
Production on the spin-off series The Sarah Jane Adventures was brought to a premature close due to the death of series star Elisabeth Sladen. This left several planned scripts and storyline ideas unused for Series 5 and 6.

Meet Mr. Smith
Written by Gareth Roberts and Clayton Hickman. Planned for the seventh and eighth episodes of the fifth series, and would have seen Mr. Smith, Sarah Jane's alien computer, adopting a human form.

The Thirteenth Floor
Written by Phil Ford. Planned for the ninth and tenth episodes of the fifth series, it would have focused on Clyde and Rani and seen them trapped in the lift of a tower block and spending decades alone together. This script was reworked by Ford into the Wizards vs Aliens Series 2-story of the same name.

The Battle of Bannerman Road
Written by Russell T. Davies. Planned for the eleventh and twelfth episodes of the fifth series, it would have featured the revelation that Sky was actually the child of the Trickster. It would also have seen the return of Katy Manning as Jo Jones and the destruction of Bannerman Road.

Full Moon
Written by Clayton Hickman. Planned as a Halloween special for a Live 2011 broadcast. Set at Halloween, it would have seen an encounter with the pagan gods Gog and Magog, who attempt to escape from a decaying alien prison ship.

The Station
Written by Clayton Hickman. Planned as a Halloween special for a Live 2011 broadcast. Set at Halloween, it would have seen the gang transported back to the years 1911 and 1934.

"Untitled storyline (Hickman)"
Written by Clayton Hickman. Planned as a Halloween special for a Live 2011 broadcast. Set at Halloween, it would have seen an encounter with an hideous gargoyle-like creature.

Night of the Spectre
Written by Phil Ford. Planned as an animated Halloween special for a 2011 broadcast. It would have seen the return of former series regular Maria Jackson and her father Alan who had since moved to the USA.

Series 6
The Sarah Jane Adventures ended as of Series 5 which was only half complete. There were plans to bring Ace back in Series 6 and there was also a possibility of the series rebooting itself to a new location but because the series was suspended during mid production of Series 5, there's no certainty of what would happen next. After the events of The Battle of Bannerman Road, Sarah Jane would have either stayed on Bannerman Road or left for new adventures in Foxgrove which was previously seen in Series 2 (The Temptation of Sarah Jane Smith). The Battle of Bannerman Road (Series 5 finale) had a bunch of ideas and developments that were planned out but the episode itself never reached script form which means there are several possible outcomes of where the series could have gone but it would all depend on how Series 5 draws its conclusion.

"Untitled storyline (Davies)"
Written by Russell T. Davies. It would have seen the return of the Seventh Doctor's companion Ace and explained how Ace left the Doctor and what had happened to her since then.

Torchwood

Checkout
Written by Joseph Lidster as an "over-commission" for Series 2. After a series of other story pitches, Lidster was asked to work on one of Russell T Davies's standby plots concerning a spooky 24-hour supermarket to center on Jack and Ianto. Described as "Die Hard in a Supermarket", it was set after Ianto's imperfect resurrection from the dead (as was originally planned, before this storyline shifted to Owen). The store would have been possessed by a demonic creature from the Rift that manifested only late at night and which fed off of human life-force. Ianto would have able to save the day due to being already dead and got Maggie, the supermarket's last customer, out alive.

Whilst Lidster was working on the treatment, Davies decided to reclaim the idea for use as the opening episode of Series 2. Pressure from other projects meant Davies was only able to write the first scene of the episode, after which it was handed over to Chris Chibnall who incorporated it into what would become the episode "Kiss Kiss, Bang Bang". Davies was impressed with a scene from Lidster's treatment involving Ianto and Maggie on the supermarket roof and asked him to use it in an episode based around their relationship, a dead man helping a grieving widow stay alive, which became the episode "A Day in the Death", which would now feature Owen in place of Ianto.

The supermarket concept was also considered for use as an episode of Sarah Jane Adventures (see above section) under the working title of "Supermarket Sweep".

Into the Silence
Written by Joseph Lidster. A story idea considered for the second series, it would have seen Jack being transported to Hell by a malevolent cab driver. It was later reworked by Lidster as the Torchwood audiobook Into the Shadows.

Communion
Written by Joseph Lidster. A story idea considered for the second series, it would have involved a Messiah-like figure controlling nightclubbers. The plot shares similarities with Lidster's 2002 Doctor Who audio drama "The Rapture".

Children
Written by Joseph Lidster. A story idea considered for the second series, it would have seen a serial killer targeting former classmates of Gwen's.

Deadline
Written by Phil Ford. This story idea was planned as fourth episode of Series 2. It originated from a strange phone Russell T Davies recalled having where the line suddenly went dead followed another person's voice speaking. The episode would have focused on Owen and have involved his medical background as something in the phones causes a series of suicides across Cardiff.

Ford completed two drafts of the script before being asked to instead work on that year's finale episode for Sarah Jane Adventures. By the time he had returned to work on the episode plans for Series 2 had changed significantly. The story arc for series two now involved Owen (rather than Ianto) being killed mid-season and returned to life in an undead state, meaning that the story no longer fit Owen. Ford instead began work on a different episode for Series 2 which would be broadcast as "Something Borrowed".

After the collapse of Phil Ford's version of the script, Joseph Lidster was invited to develop the idea as "1471" before it was finally reworked by Ford into the Torchwood radio play "The Dead Line".

Cross My Palm with Silver
Written by James Moran. This story idea started out as an earlier version of what would become "Sleeper". The character of Beth had originally been envisaged as a fake fortune teller who was made her predictions come true with her unknown telekinetic abilities.

Unplugged
Written by James Moran. The story would seen Toshiko having to cope without the use of gadgets or weaponry.

Ooze
Written by James Moran. A story idea considered for Series 2, it would seen a group of Neo-Nazis targeting ethnic minorities with an alien weapon that caused the victims to lose all their bones.

The Jinx
Written by Andrew Cartmel a former script editor for Doctor Who. Initially pitched for Series 2, it involved a curse being put on Gwen. Development stalled due to it conflicting with the death of Ianto/Owen storyline and Gwen and Rhys' wedding in "Something Borrowed". It was then hoped to be part of Series 3 until it was abandoned in favor of the five episode Children of Earth storyline.

Diplomatic Mission
Written by Andrew Cartmel. A story idea considered for the second series, it involved a group of aliens attempting to close the Rift by destroying Earth.

The Rift Preservation Society
Written by Andrew Cartmel. A story idea considered for Series 2, it involved a group of eco-warriors who see the Rift as a natural force that shouldn't be interfered with.

Babymother
Written by Andrew Cartmel. A story idea considered for the second series, it involved a single mother on a sinister housing estate being controlled by an alien cuckoo that has taken the form of her baby. It was later reworked by Cartmel as the Torchwood short story "The Wrong Hands" which featured as part of the Consequences anthology.

Dominant Life Form
Written by Andrew Cartmel. A story idea considered for Series 2, it would have seen the Torchwood SUV being possessed by an alien consciousness.

Revenants
Written by Joseph Lidster. This story idea started out as an earlier version of what would become "A Day in the Death". It would have focused on Ianto coming to terms with his recent death and involved a group of people affected by various near-death experiences being targeted by an "angel of death".

SkyPoint
Written by Phil Ford. A story idea considered for the second series, it would have seen an alien creature living in an apartment block where other residents are going missing. It was later reworked by Ford into the Torchwood novel of the same name.

"Unused Miracle Day storyline (Davies, Espenson and Chibnall)"
In the episode commentary of the Torchwood: Miracle Day episode The Blood Line, Russell T. Davies talked about a storyline which was an early version of the Miracle Day storyline that was for thirteen episodes of the season which was devised by Russell T. Davies, Jane Espenson and Chris Chibnall. (who wrote episodes for the first two series.) In this storyline, many of the episodes would have been kept the same but the episode "Immortal Sins" would have killed off the character of Andy Davidson. He would have become a Category One. This may have also been in a different place in the thirteen episode version. The final two episodes would have been "The Blood Line" up until the thirteenth episode in where the Blessing would have started to kill people in Shanghai and Buenos Aires, resulting in the Blessing sites having to be blown up or otherwise destroyed.

Proposed films
In the mid-1960s, two motion pictures starring Peter Cushing as the non-canon "Dr. Who" (a human in the films) were produced, based on the television stories The Daleks and The Dalek Invasion of Earth. Since then, there have been periodic further attempts to adapt Doctor Who as a feature film.

Marco Polo adaptation
Walt Disney Productions had expressed interest in a remake of the Doctor Who serial Marco Polo as a straight historical adventure film with the element of Doctor and his companions removed.

Doctor Who Meets Scratchman

During spare time in filming, Tom Baker (the Fourth Doctor) and Ian Marter (Harry Sullivan), who later novelised several Doctor Who scripts for Target Books, wrote a script for a Doctor Who film which they entitled Doctor Who Meets Scratchman (alternatively Doctor Who and the Big Game). The script saw the Doctor encounter the Devil (who called himself Harry Scratch or Scratchman), the Daleks, robots known as Cybors, scarecrows made from bones and, briefly, the Greek god Pan. At times Vincent Price and Twiggy were associated with the production. Price would have played the villain Harry Scratch and Twiggy a replacement female companion after Elisabeth Sladen had left the TV series.

The finale of the film was to have taken place on a giant pinball table, with the Doctor, Harry and Sarah dodging balls as well as battling Daleks on the board. Up until the late 1970s, Baker repeatedly tried to attract funding for the film. In an interview in 1975, Baker had referred to the flaws of the two Peter Cushing Dalek films in the 1960s, saying "There have been two Doctor Who films in the past, both rather poor... There are many dangers in transporting a television series onto the big screen... a lot of things that you could get away with on the small screen wouldn't wash in the cinema." At one point, he received substantial donations from fans, but after taking legal advice was forced to return them. The plans were dropped. With the release of Star Wars, it also seemed futile for a movie of this kind to even try to compete.

In late January 2019, BBC Books released a novelization of the screenplay by Tom Baker himself, co-written with James Goss, coming a year after Goss had adapted Krikkitmen (see above).

Doctor Who and the Krikkitmen

Lacuna film proposals (1987–1994)
As the original Doctor Who series was nearing its end and continuing during the first interregnum (1989–1996), numerous attempts were made to adapt the series for the big screen for the first time since the Peter Cushing films of the 1960s. Jean-Marc Lofficier, in his book The Nth Doctor, profiles a number of film proposals, some of which came close to being produced. Ultimately, however, the only film version of Doctor Who (other than the two Cushing films) produced to date has been the 1996 made-for-TV film which was developed as a continuation of the TV series rather than a reboot or reimagining of the concept. At one point, the film had the full working title, Doctor Who: The Last of the Time Lords. Among the script proposals profiled by Lofficier are several submissions by Doctor Who and Space: 1999 alumnus Johnny Byrne, plus others by Robert DeLaurentis, Adrian Rigelsford, John Leekley, Mark Ezra and Denny Martin Flinn. The title "Last of the Time Lords" would later be used by Russell T Davies for an episode in 2007.

Other related works
Radio series
During the late sixties, a radio series starring Peter Cushing, who had played a human version of Doctor called "Dr. Who" in feature films featuring the Daleks, had been planned to be produced. A collaboration between Stanmark Productions and Watermill Productions, a pilot had been recorded and a further 52 episodes were to be produced. The pilot story titled "Journey into Time"' featured The Doctor and his granddaughter travel to the time of the American Revolution. The script was written by future Doctor Who television series writer Malcolm Hulke. The recording remains lost. A full transcript of the first episode appears in the magazine Nothing at the End of the Lane, Issue 3.

War World
Proposed stage play written by Ben Aaronovitch and Andrew Cartmel set at partly in space. It would have opened at a hippy festival at Stonehenge, it would featured honor-obsessed insect aliens called the Metraxi, a "data vampire", space pirates and revealed the real purpose of Stonehenge: to protect Earth against alien threats, as posited by a hippy at the festival.  It was replaced by Terrance Dicks's The Ultimate Adventure.

Doctor Who webcast
In 2003, the BBC announced the return of Doctor Who, as a series of webcasts to air on bbc.com. Richard E. Grant was announced as the Ninth Doctor. A webcast, written by Paul Cornell, entitled Scream of the Shalka was completed, and aired on bbc.com. This was followed by an online text short story entitled "The Feast of the Stone". Work was already well underway on another webcast story entitled Blood of the Robots. This was to be written by Simon Clark. Before production began, it was announced that Doctor Who would be returning to television, with Russell T. Davies as its showrunner and as a result production was permanently halted. The synopsis: "A blend of adventure, drama and humour. The Doctor arrives to find a world full of intelligent, sensitive robots that have been abandoned by their human owners, who are too squeamish to 'kill' them when they're obsolete. Now ruthless salvage squads are hunting the robots in order to make room for human settlers forced to migrate from their dangerously over-crowded home planet." A detailed episode breakdown of "Blood of the Robots" was published in the book "Scream of the Shalka" by Jon Arnold, released by Observe Books in 2017 as part of The Black Archive series of Doctor Who books.

See also
 Doctor Who: The Lost Stories''

References

Bibliography 

 
 
 
 
 
 .
 .
 .
 .
 .
 .
 
 .
 .
 .
 .
 .
 .
 .
 .
 .
 .
 .
 .
 .
 .
 .
 .
 .
 .
 .
 .
 .
 .
 .
 .
 .
 .
 .
 .
 .
 .
 .
 .
 .
 .
 .
 .
 .
 .
 .
 .
 .
 
 
 
 
 .
 .
 .
 .
 .
 .
 .
 .
 .
 .
 .
 .
 .
 
 
 .

Unmade Serials
Doctor Who serials
Unmade Serials